= Saint-Pierremont =

Saint-Pierremont is the name of several communes in France:

- Saint-Pierremont, Aisne, in the Aisne département
- Saint-Pierremont, Ardennes, in the Ardennes département
- Saint-Pierremont, Vosges, in the Vosges département
