= Cilly =

Cilly can refer to:

- an alternative spelling of Celje, the third largest city in Slovenia
- Cilly, Aisne, a commune of the Aisne département in northern France
- Cilly Aussem (1909–1963), German female tennis player
