= Tavaux-et-Pontséricourt =

- Commune
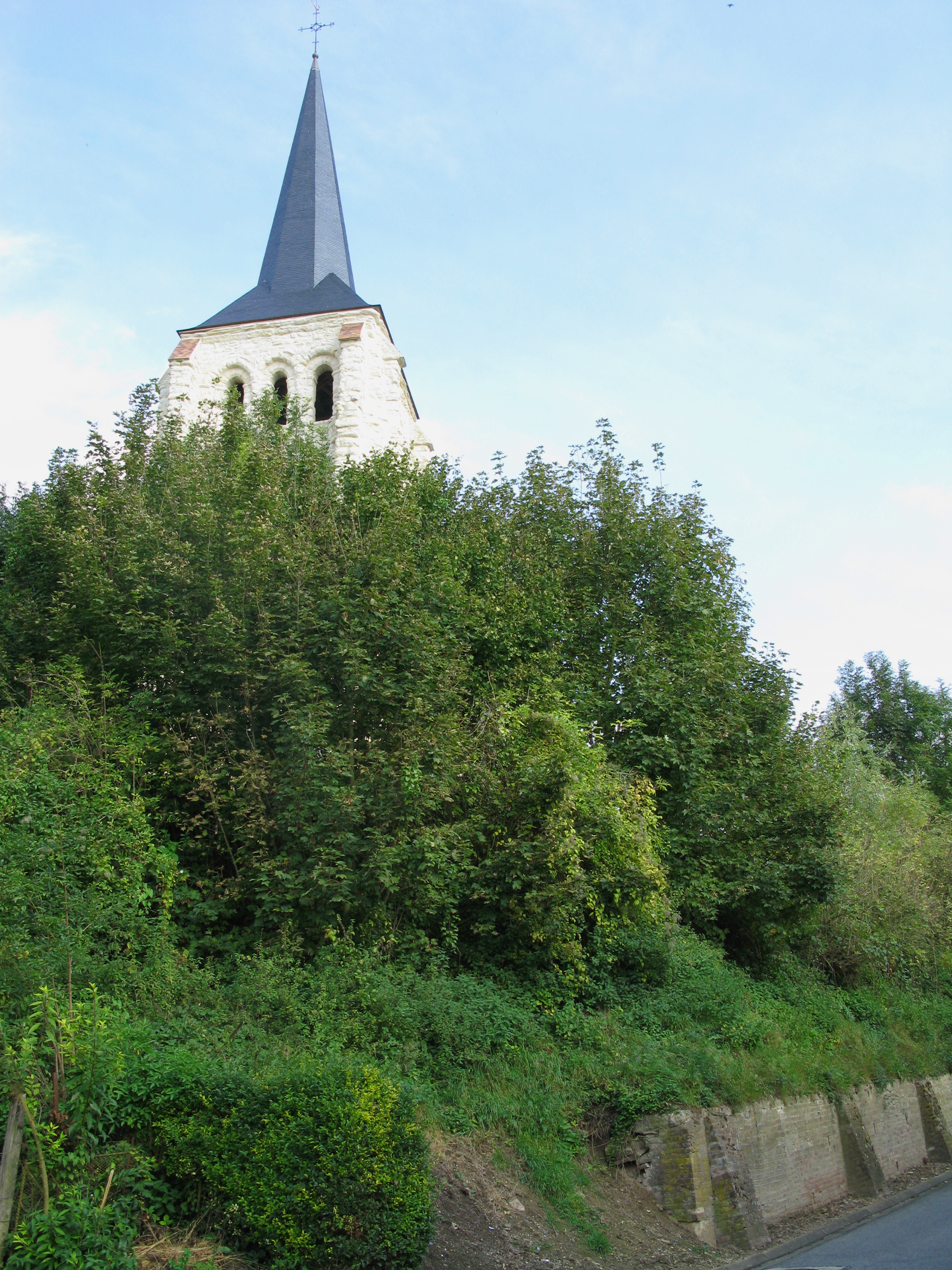
- The stone bell tower, of a brilliant white due to a recent restoration, emerges from the wooded hill overlooking a part of the village.
- Location of Tavaux-et-Pontséricourt
- Location within France Location within Hauts-de-France
- Coordinates: 49°43′51″N 3°54′20″E
- Country: France
- Region: Hauts-de-France
- Department: Aisne
- Arrondissement: Laon
- Canton: Marle
- Intercommunality: Pays de la Serre

Government
  - Mayor (2026–32): Anthony Cazenave
- Area^{1}: 25.42 km^{2} (9.81 sq mi)
- Elevation: 87 m (285 ft)
- Highest elevation: 185 m (607 ft)
- Lowest elevation: 92 m (302 ft)
- Population (2023): 543
  - Density: 21.4/km^{2} (55.3/sq mi)
- Time zone: UTC+01:00 (CET)
  - Summer (DST): UTC+02:00 (CEST)
- INSEE/Postal code: 02737 /02250
- ^{1} French Land Register data, which excludes lakes, ponds, glaciers > 1 km^{2} (0.386 sq mi or 247 acres) and river estuaries.

Tavaux-et-Pontséricourt (French pronunciation: [tavo e pɔ̃seʁikuʁ]) is a commune in the Aisne department in Hauts-de-France in northern France.

== Population ==
Historical population
Year	Pop.	±% p.a.
1968	766	—
1975	752	−0.26%
1982	666	−1.72%
1990	622	−0.85%
1999	590	−0.59%
2007	561	−0.63%
2012	599	+1.32%
2017	569	−1.02%
2023	543	−0.78%
Source: INSEE

== See also ==
- Communes of the Aisne department
