= Thiernu =

- Commune
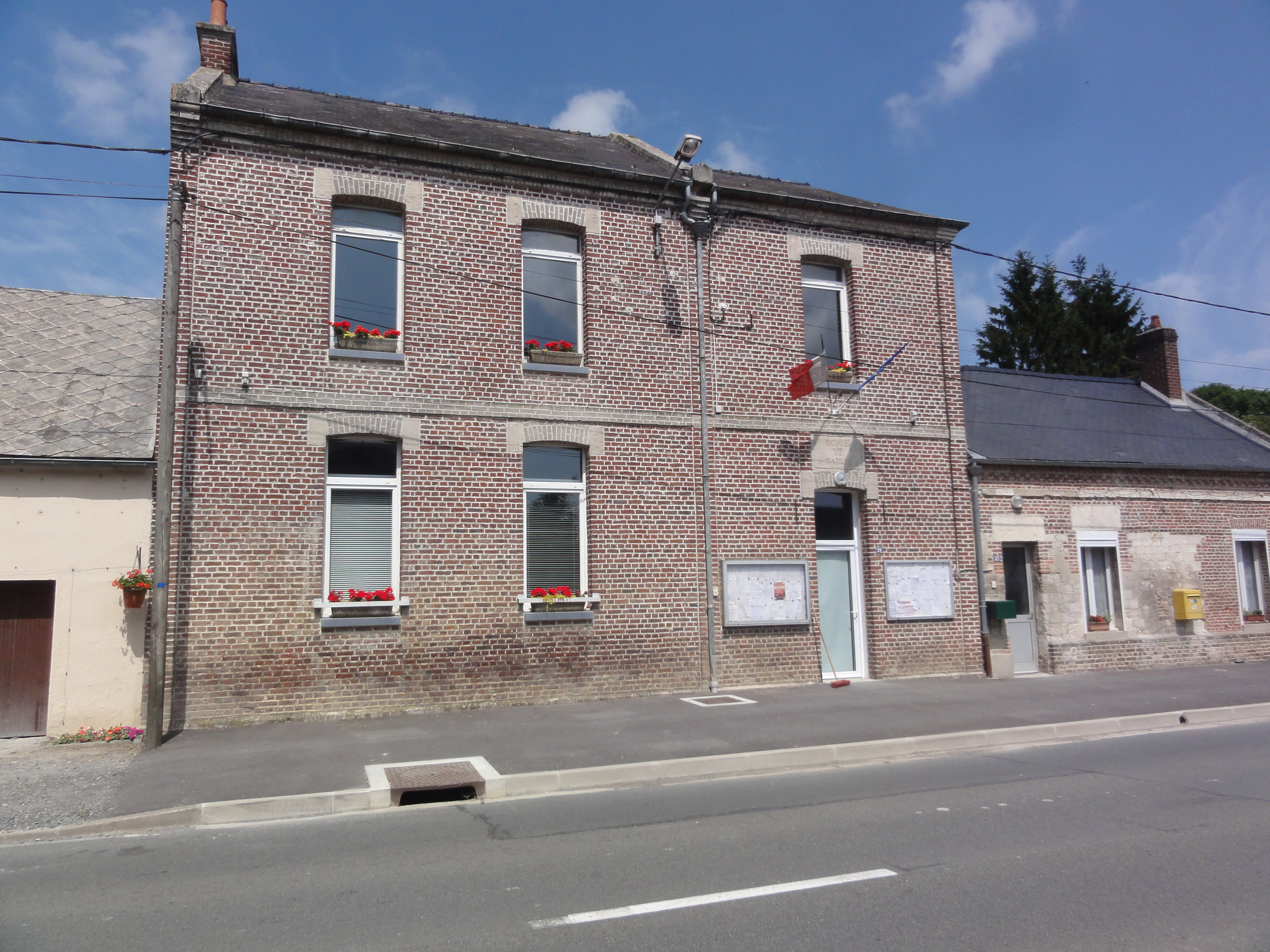
- The town hall of Thiernu
- Location of Thiernu
- Location within France Location within Hauts-de-France
- Coordinates: 49°45′42″N 3°47′23″E
- Country: France
- Region: Hauts-de-France
- Department: Aisne
- Arrondissement: Laon
- Canton: Marle
- Intercommunality: Pays de la Serre

Government
  - Mayor (2026–32): Jean-Claude Guérin
- Area^{1}: 6.16 km^{2} (2.38 sq mi)
- Elevation: 89 m (292 ft)
- Highest elevation: 157 m (515 ft)
- Lowest elevation: 78 m (256 ft)
- Population (2023): 122
  - Density: 19.8/km^{2} (51.3/sq mi)
- Time zone: UTC+01:00 (CET)
  - Summer (DST): UTC+02:00 (CEST)
- INSEE/Postal code: 02742 /02250
- ^{1} French Land Register data, which excludes lakes, ponds, glaciers > 1 km^{2} (0.386 sq mi or 247 acres) and river estuaries.

Thiernu (French pronunciation: [tjɛʁny]) is a commune in the Aisne department in Hauts-de-France in northern France.

== Population ==
Historical population
Year	Pop.	±% p.a.
1968	188	—
1975	174	−1.10%
1982	155	−1.64%
1990	145	−0.83%
1999	128	−1.38%
2007	118	−1.01%
2012	99	−3.45%
2017	102	+0.60%
2023	122	+3.03%
Source: INSEE

== See also ==
- Communes of the Aisne department
