= Grandlup-et-Fay =

- Commune
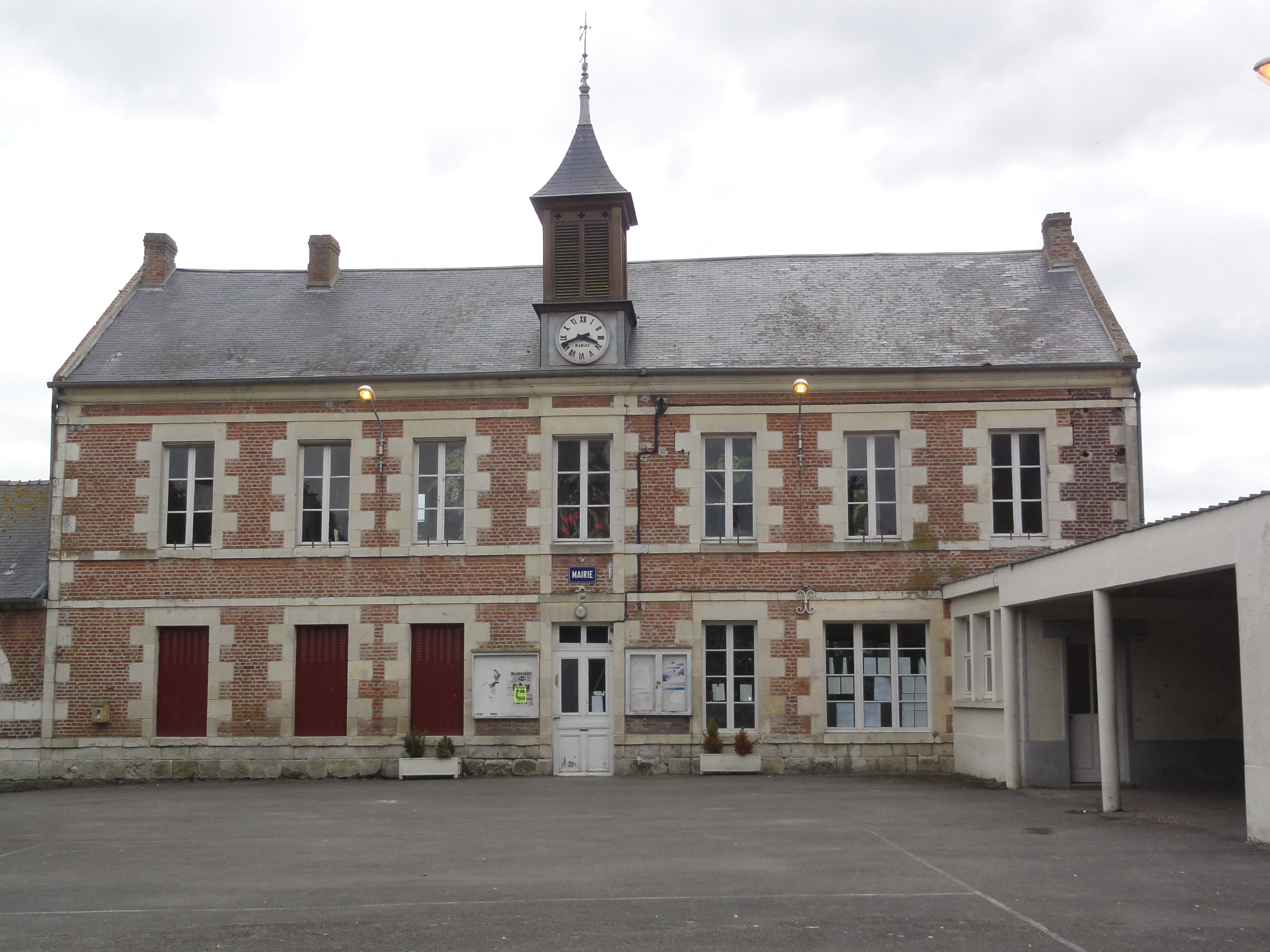
- The town hall of Grandlup-et-Fay
- Location of Grandlup-et-Fay
- Location within France Location within Hauts-de-France
- Coordinates: 49°39′30″N 3°44′16″E
- Country: France
- Region: Hauts-de-France
- Department: Aisne
- Arrondissement: Laon
- Canton: Marle
- Intercommunality: Pays de la Serre

Government
  - Mayor (2026–32): Christian Vuilliot
- Area^{1}: 20.3 km^{2} (7.8 sq mi)
- Elevation: 84 m (276 ft)
- Highest elevation: 101 m (331 ft)
- Lowest elevation: 63 m (207 ft)
- Population (2023): 275
  - Density: 13.5/km^{2} (35.1/sq mi)
- Time zone: UTC+01:00 (CET)
  - Summer (DST): UTC+02:00 (CEST)
- INSEE/Postal code: 02353 /02350
- ^{1} French Land Register data, which excludes lakes, ponds, glaciers > 1 km^{2} (0.386 sq mi or 247 acres) and river estuaries.

Grandlup-et-Fay is a commune in the Aisne department in Hauts-de-France in northern France.

== Population ==
Historical population
Year	Pop.	±% p.a.
1968	379	—
1975	348	−1.21%
1982	309	−1.68%
1990	329	+0.79%
1999	325	−0.14%
2007	318	−0.27%
2012	311	−0.44%
2017	301	−0.65%
2023	275	−1.49%
Source: INSEE

== See also ==
- Communes of the Aisne department
