= Châtillon-lès-Sons =

- Commune
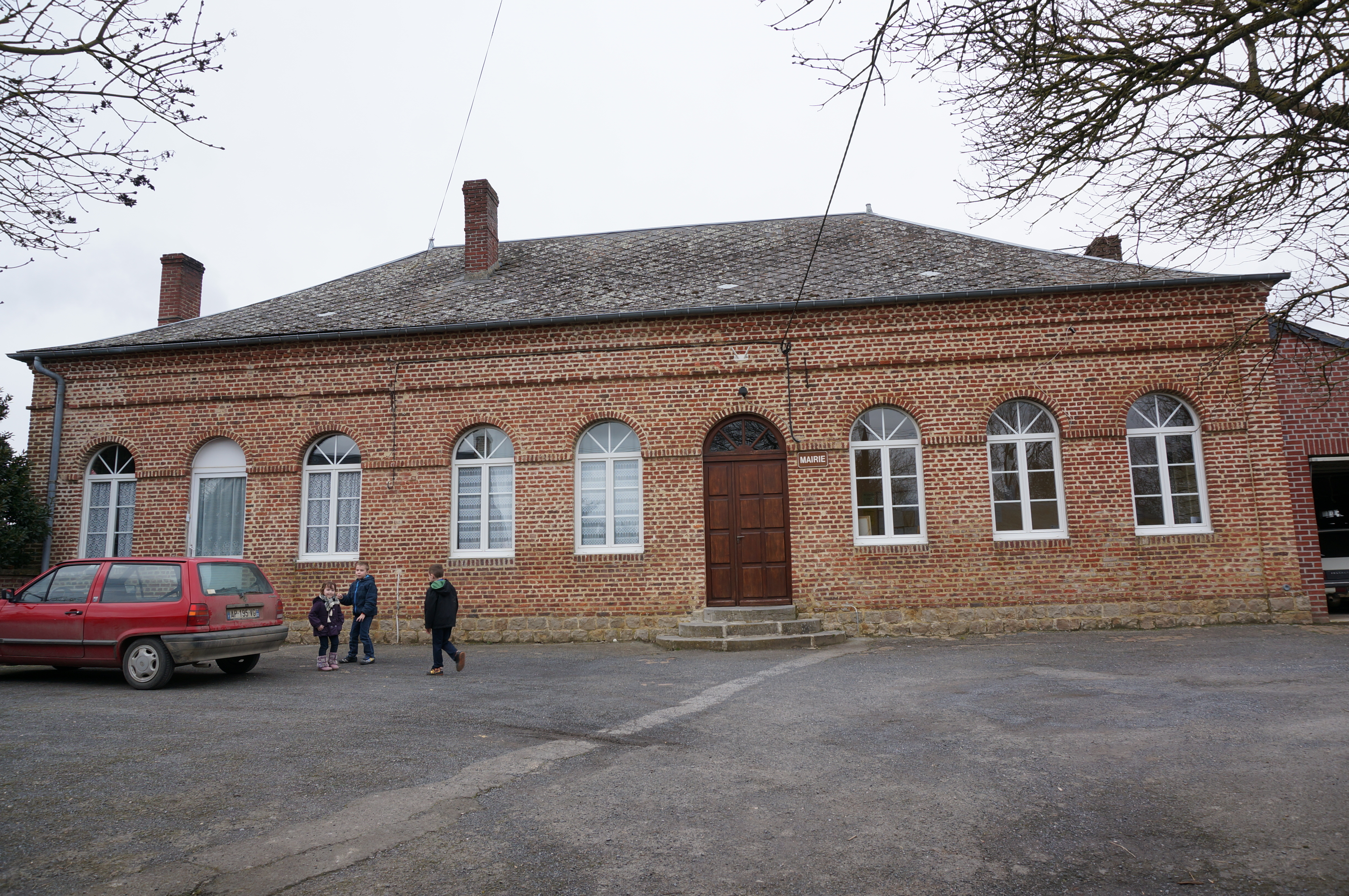
- The town hall of Châtillon-lès-Sons
- Location of Châtillon-lès-Sons
- Location within France Location within Hauts-de-France
- Coordinates: 49°45′34″N 3°41′06″E
- Country: France
- Region: Hauts-de-France
- Department: Aisne
- Arrondissement: Laon
- Canton: Marle
- Intercommunality: Pays de la Serre

Government
  - Mayor (2026–32): Audrey Collet
- Area^{1}: 10.56 km^{2} (4.08 sq mi)
- Elevation: 157 m (515 ft)
- Highest elevation: 151 m (495 ft)
- Lowest elevation: 80 m (260 ft)
- Population (2023): 83
  - Density: 7.9/km^{2} (20/sq mi)
- Time zone: UTC+01:00 (CET)
  - Summer (DST): UTC+02:00 (CEST)
- INSEE/Postal code: 02169 /02270
- ^{1} French Land Register data, which excludes lakes, ponds, glaciers > 1 km^{2} (0.386 sq mi or 247 acres) and river estuaries.

Châtillon-lès-Sons (French pronunciation: [ʃatijɔ̃ lɛ sɔ̃], literally Châtillon near Sons) is a commune in the Aisne department in Hauts-de-France in northern France.

== Population ==
Historical population
Year	Pop.	±% p.a.
1968	175	—
1975	102	−7.42%
1982	101	−0.14%
1990	82	−2.57%
1999	88	+0.79%
2007	81	−1.03%
2012	88	+1.67%
2017	83	−1.16%
2023	83	+0.00%
Source: INSEE

== See also ==
- Communes of the Aisne department
