= Vesles-et-Caumont =

- Commune
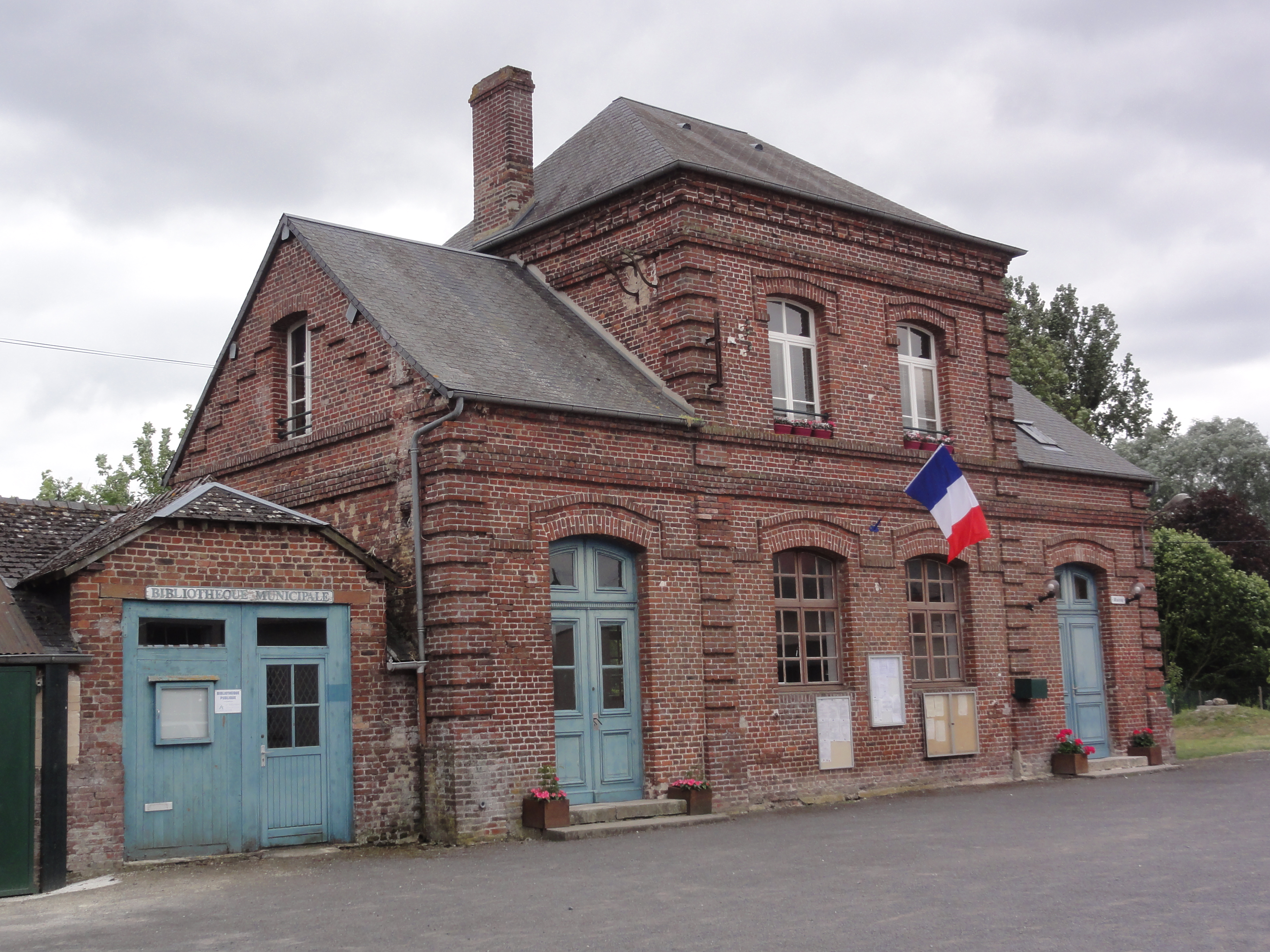
- The town hall of Vesles-et-Caumont
- Location of Vesles-et-Caumont
- Location within France Location within Hauts-de-France
- Coordinates: 49°40′15″N 3°47′07″E
- Country: France
- Region: Hauts-de-France
- Department: Aisne
- Arrondissement: Laon
- Canton: Marle
- Intercommunality: Pays de la Serre

Government
  - Mayor (2026–32): Nathalie Lefevre
- Area^{1}: 10.34 km^{2} (3.99 sq mi)
- Elevation: 70 m (230 ft)
- Highest elevation: 105 m (344 ft)
- Lowest elevation: 67 m (220 ft)
- Population (2023): 235
  - Density: 22.7/km^{2} (58.9/sq mi)
- Time zone: UTC+01:00 (CET)
  - Summer (DST): UTC+02:00 (CEST)
- INSEE/Postal code: 02790 /02350
- ^{1} French Land Register data, which excludes lakes, ponds, glaciers > 1 km^{2} (0.386 sq mi or 247 acres) and river estuaries.

Vesles-et-Caumont (French pronunciation: [vɛl e komɔ̃]) is a commune in the Aisne department in Hauts-de-France in northern France.

== Population ==
Historical population
Year	Pop.	±% p.a.
1968	233	—
1975	198	−2.30%
1982	178	−1.51%
1990	182	+0.28%
1999	194	+0.71%
2007	201	+0.44%
2012	234	+3.09%
2017	231	−0.26%
2023	235	+0.29%
Source: INSEE

== See also ==
- Communes of the Aisne department
