= Mesbrecourt-Richecourt =

- Commune
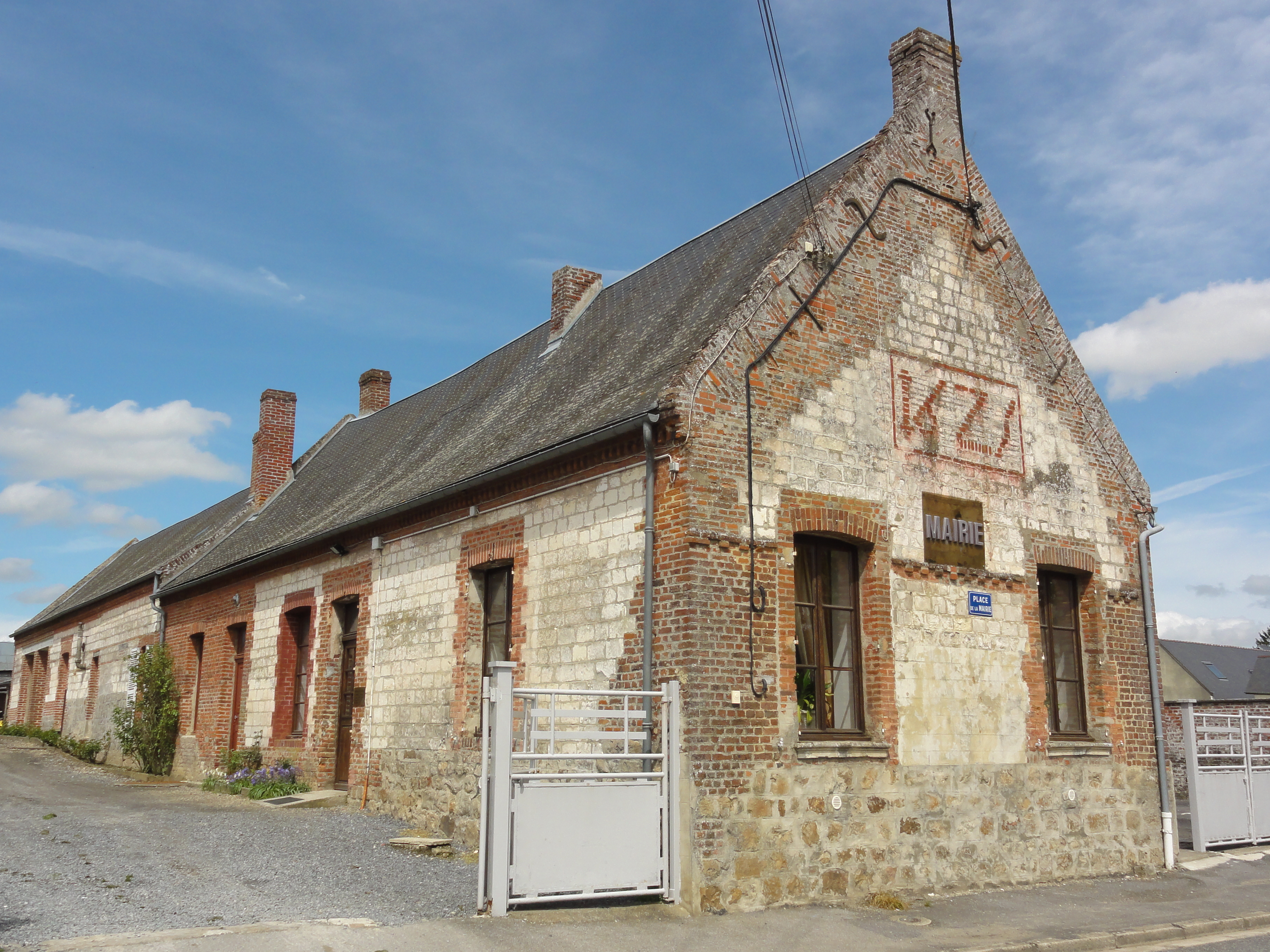
- The town hall of Mesbrecourt-Richecourt
- Location of Mesbrecourt-Richecourt
- Location within France Location within Hauts-de-France
- Coordinates: 49°42′10″N 3°32′33″E
- Country: France
- Region: Hauts-de-France
- Department: Aisne
- Arrondissement: Laon
- Canton: Marle
- Intercommunality: Pays de la Serre

Government
  - Mayor (2026–32): Hubert Compère
- Area^{1}: 8.98 km^{2} (3.47 sq mi)
- Elevation: 65 m (213 ft)
- Highest elevation: 113 m (371 ft)
- Lowest elevation: 54 m (177 ft)
- Population (2023): 320
  - Density: 36/km^{2} (92/sq mi)
- Time zone: UTC+01:00 (CET)
  - Summer (DST): UTC+02:00 (CEST)
- INSEE/Postal code: 02480 /02270
- ^{1} French Land Register data, which excludes lakes, ponds, glaciers > 1 km^{2} (0.386 sq mi or 247 acres) and river estuaries.

Mesbrecourt-Richecourt (French pronunciation: [mɛbʁəkuʁ ʁiʃkuʁ]) is a commune in the Aisne department in Hauts-de-France in northern France.

== Population ==
Historical population
Year	Pop.	±% p.a.
1968	363	—
1975	317	−1.92%
1982	348	+1.34%
1990	354	+0.21%
1999	289	−2.23%
2007	286	−0.13%
2012	299	+0.89%
2017	305	+0.40%
2023	320	+0.80%
Source: INSEE

== See also ==
- Communes of the Aisne department
