= La Vallée-au-Blé =

- Commune
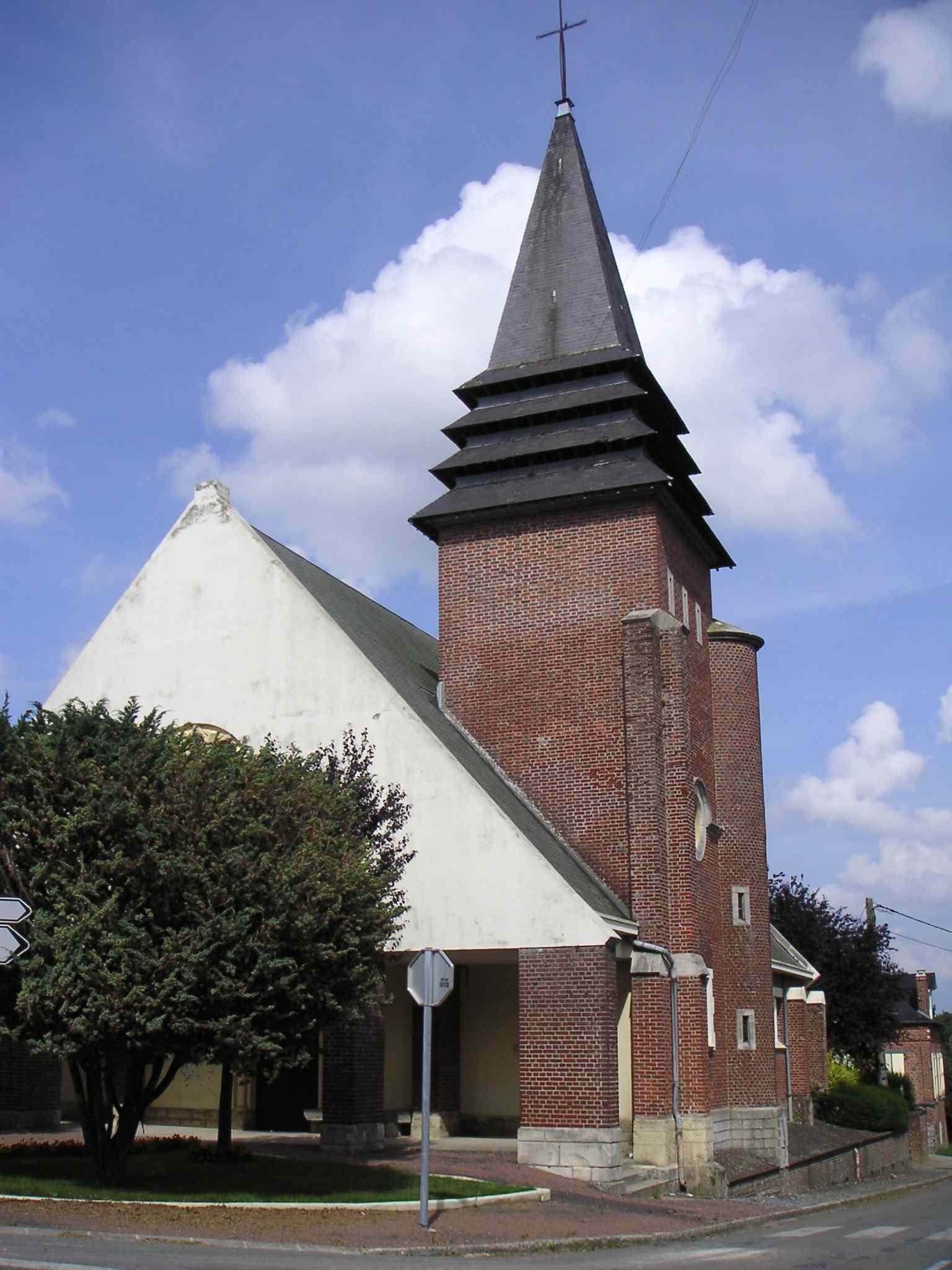
- The church of La Vallée-au-Blé
- Location of La Vallée-au-Blé
- Location within France Location within Hauts-de-France
- Coordinates: 49°51′33″N 3°47′23″E
- Country: France
- Region: Hauts-de-France
- Department: Aisne
- Arrondissement: Vervins
- Canton: Marle
- Intercommunality: Thiérache du Centre

Government
  - Mayor (2026–32): Éric Lecompte
- Area^{1}: 5.17 km^{2} (2.00 sq mi)
- Elevation: 173 m (568 ft)
- Highest elevation: 186 m (610 ft)
- Lowest elevation: 164 m (538 ft)
- Population (2023): 355
  - Density: 68.7/km^{2} (178/sq mi)
- Time zone: UTC+01:00 (CET)
  - Summer (DST): UTC+02:00 (CEST)
- INSEE/Postal code: 02759 /02140
- ^{1} French Land Register data, which excludes lakes, ponds, glaciers > 1 km^{2} (0.386 sq mi or 247 acres) and river estuaries.

La Vallée-au-Blé (French pronunciation: [la vale o ble]) is a commune in the Aisne department in Hauts-de-France in northern France.

== Population ==
Historical population
Year	Pop.	±% p.a.
1968	450	—
1975	405	−1.49%
1982	413	+0.28%
1990	366	−1.50%
1999	342	−0.75%
2007	292	−1.96%
2012	372	+4.96%
2017	365	−0.38%
2023	355	−0.46%
Source: INSEE

== See also ==
- Communes of the Aisne department
