= Rogny =

- Commune
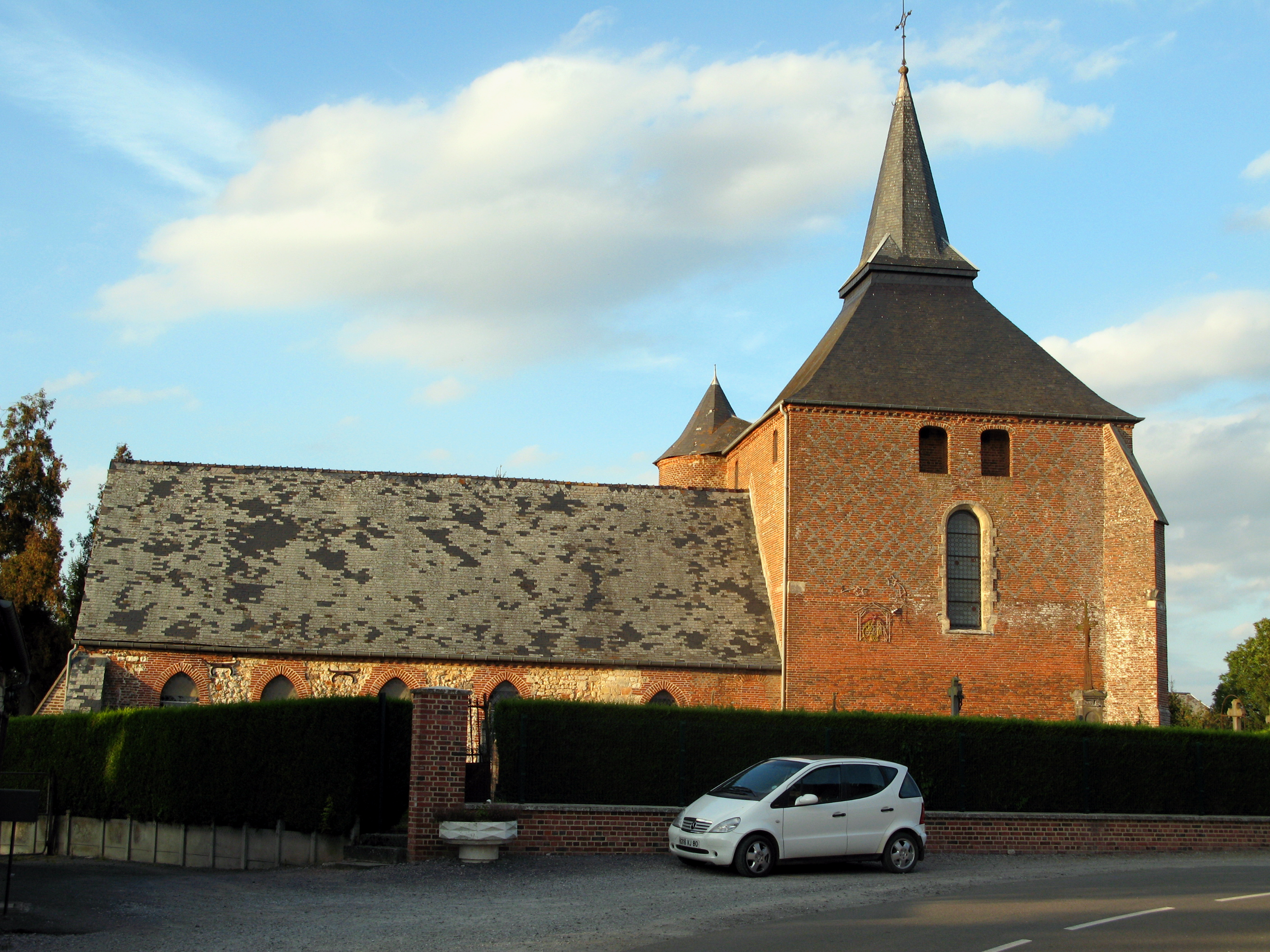
- The church of Rogny
- Location of Rogny
- Location within France Location within Hauts-de-France
- Coordinates: 49°46′10″N 3°48′38″E
- Country: France
- Region: Hauts-de-France
- Department: Aisne
- Arrondissement: Vervins
- Canton: Marle
- Intercommunality: Thiérache du Centre

Government
  - Mayor (2026–32): Aude-Emmanuelle Martin
- Area^{1}: 5.61 km^{2} (2.17 sq mi)
- Elevation: 114 m (374 ft)
- Highest elevation: 159 m (522 ft)
- Lowest elevation: 81 m (266 ft)
- Population (2023): 95
  - Density: 17/km^{2} (44/sq mi)
- Time zone: UTC+01:00 (CET)
  - Summer (DST): UTC+02:00 (CEST)
- INSEE/Postal code: 02652 /02140
- ^{1} French Land Register data, which excludes lakes, ponds, glaciers > 1 km^{2} (0.386 sq mi or 247 acres) and river estuaries.

Rogny (French pronunciation: [ʁɔɲi]) is a commune in the Aisne department in Hauts-de-France in northern France.

== Population ==
Historical population
Year	Pop.	±% p.a.
1968	142	—
1975	138	−0.41%
1982	138	+0.00%
1990	129	−0.84%
1999	116	−1.17%
2007	100	−1.84%
2012	107	+1.36%
2017	112	+0.92%
2023	95	−2.71%
Source: INSEE

== See also ==
- Communes of the Aisne department
