= Montigny-le-Franc =

- Commune
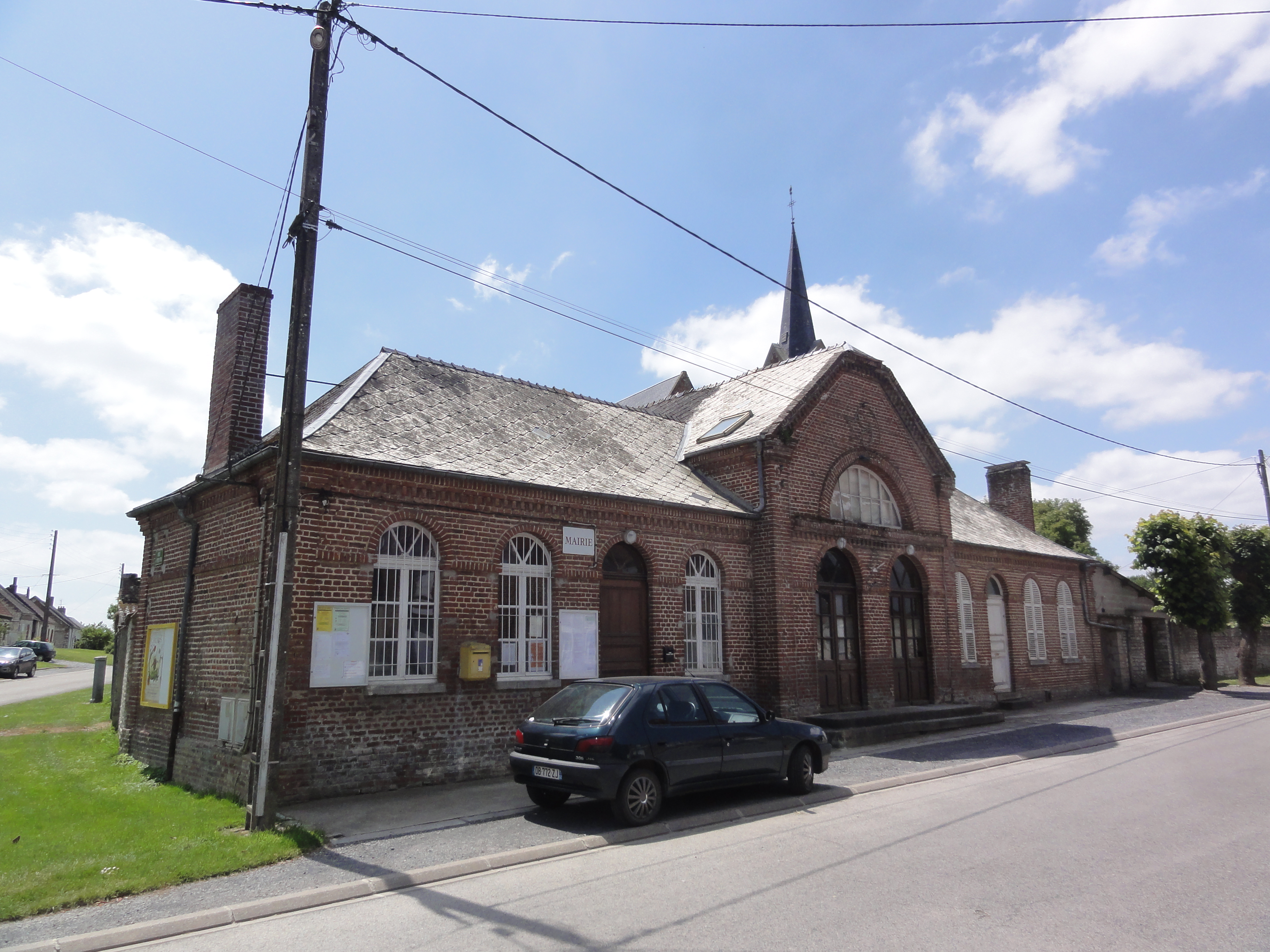
- The town hall of Montigny-le-Franc
- Location of Montigny-le-Franc
- Location within France Location within Hauts-de-France
- Coordinates: 49°41′19″N 3°54′29″E
- Country: France
- Region: Hauts-de-France
- Department: Aisne
- Arrondissement: Laon
- Canton: Marle
- Intercommunality: Pays de la Serre

Government
  - Mayor (2026–32): Alexandre Franquet
- Area^{1}: 9.9 km^{2} (3.8 sq mi)
- Highest elevation: 150 m (490 ft)
- Lowest elevation: 105 m (344 ft)
- Population (2023): 141
  - Density: 14/km^{2} (37/sq mi)
- Time zone: UTC+01:00 (CET)
  - Summer (DST): UTC+02:00 (CEST)
- INSEE/Postal code: 02513 /02250
- ^{1} French Land Register data, which excludes lakes, ponds, glaciers > 1 km^{2} (0.386 sq mi or 247 acres) and river estuaries.

Montigny-le-Franc (French pronunciation: [mɔ̃tiɲi lə fʁɑ̃]) is a commune in the Aisne department in Hauts-de-France in northern France.

== Population ==
Historical population
| Year | Pop. | ±% p.a. |
|---|---|---|
| 1968 | 238 | — |
| 1975 | 203 | −2.25% |
| 1982 | 206 | +0.21% |
| 1990 | 210 | +0.24% |
| 1999 | 192 | −0.99% |
| 2007 | 165 | −1.88% |
| 2012 | 154 | −1.37% |
| 2017 | 142 | −1.61% |
| 2023 | 141 | −0.12% |
Source: INSEE

== See also ==
- Communes of the Aisne department
