= Lugny, Aisne =

Lugny
- Commune
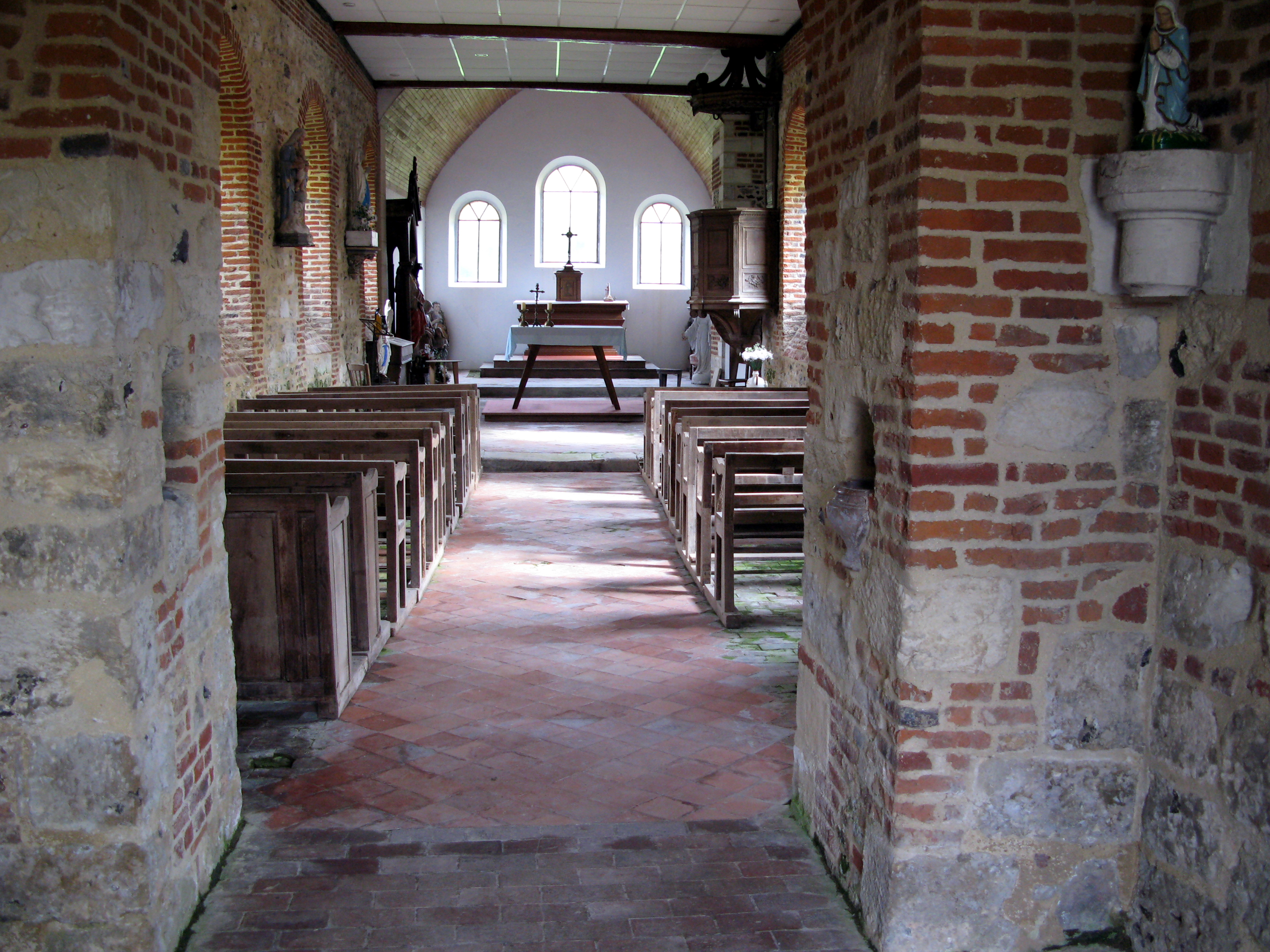
- Church interior
- Location of Lugny
- Location within France Location within Hauts-de-France
- Coordinates: 49°46′52″N 3°48′38″E
- Country: France
- Region: Hauts-de-France
- Department: Aisne
- Arrondissement: Vervins
- Canton: Marle
- Intercommunality: Thiérache du Centre

Government
  - Mayor (2026–32): Nathalie Halbe-Lefevre
- Area^{1}: 4.77 km^{2} (1.84 sq mi)
- Elevation: 96 m (315 ft)
- Highest elevation: 172 m (564 ft)
- Lowest elevation: 82 m (269 ft)
- Population (2023): 110
  - Density: 23/km^{2} (60/sq mi)
- Time zone: UTC+01:00 (CET)
  - Summer (DST): UTC+02:00 (CEST)
- INSEE/Postal code: 02444 /02140
- ^{1} French Land Register data, which excludes lakes, ponds, glaciers > 1 km^{2} (0.386 sq mi or 247 acres) and river estuaries.

Lugny (French pronunciation: [lyɲi]) is a commune in the Aisne department in Hauts-de-France in northern France.

== Population ==
Historical population
Year	Pop.	±% p.a.
1968	197	—
1975	168	−2.25%
1982	159	−0.78%
1990	153	−0.48%
1999	145	−0.59%
2007	131	−1.26%
2012	116	−2.40%
2017	114	−0.35%
2023	110	−0.59%
Source: INSEE

== See also ==
- Communes of the Aisne department
