= Chalandry =

- Commune
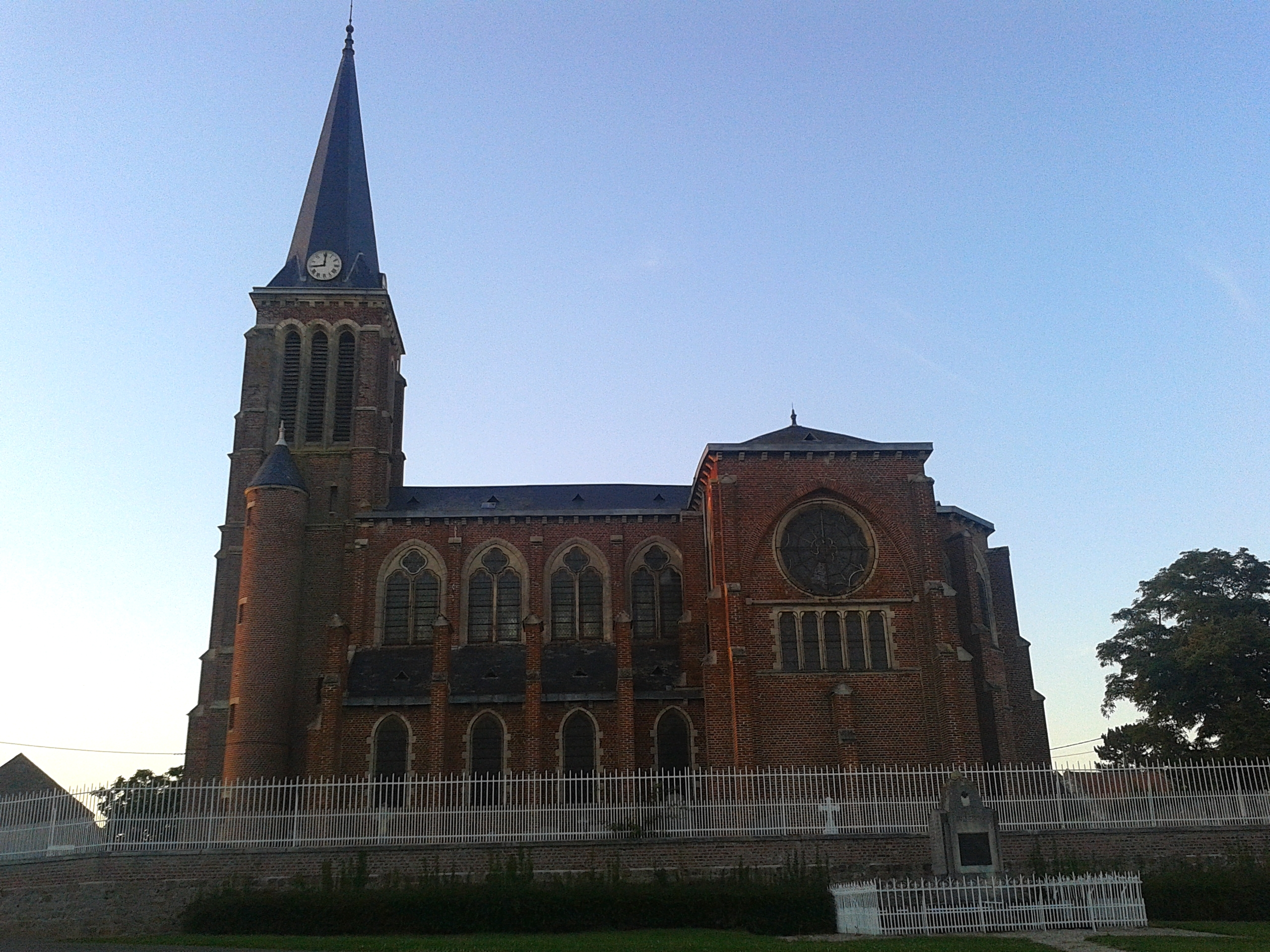
- The church of Chalandry
- Location of Chalandry
- Location within France Location within Hauts-de-France
- Coordinates: 49°40′39″N 3°38′36″E
- Country: France
- Region: Hauts-de-France
- Department: Aisne
- Arrondissement: Laon
- Canton: Marle
- Intercommunality: Pays de la Serre

Government
  - Mayor (2026–32): Jean Delville
- Area^{1}: 7.66 km^{2} (2.96 sq mi)
- Elevation: 63 m (207 ft)
- Highest elevation: 135 m (443 ft)
- Lowest elevation: 61 m (200 ft)
- Population (2023): 234
  - Density: 30.5/km^{2} (79.1/sq mi)
- Time zone: UTC+01:00 (CET)
  - Summer (DST): UTC+02:00 (CEST)
- INSEE/Postal code: 02156 /02270
- ^{1} French Land Register data, which excludes lakes, ponds, glaciers > 1 km^{2} (0.386 sq mi or 247 acres) and river estuaries.

Chalandry (French pronunciation: [ʃalɑ̃dʁi]) is a commune in the Aisne department in Hauts-de-France in northern France.

== Population ==
Historical population
Year	Pop.	±% p.a.
1968	240	—
1975	233	−0.42%
1982	230	−0.18%
1990	225	−0.27%
1999	222	−0.15%
2007	208	−0.81%
2012	236	+2.56%
2017	253	+1.40%
2023	234	−1.29%
Source: INSEE

== See also ==
- Communes of the Aisne department
