= Pargny-les-Bois =

- Commune
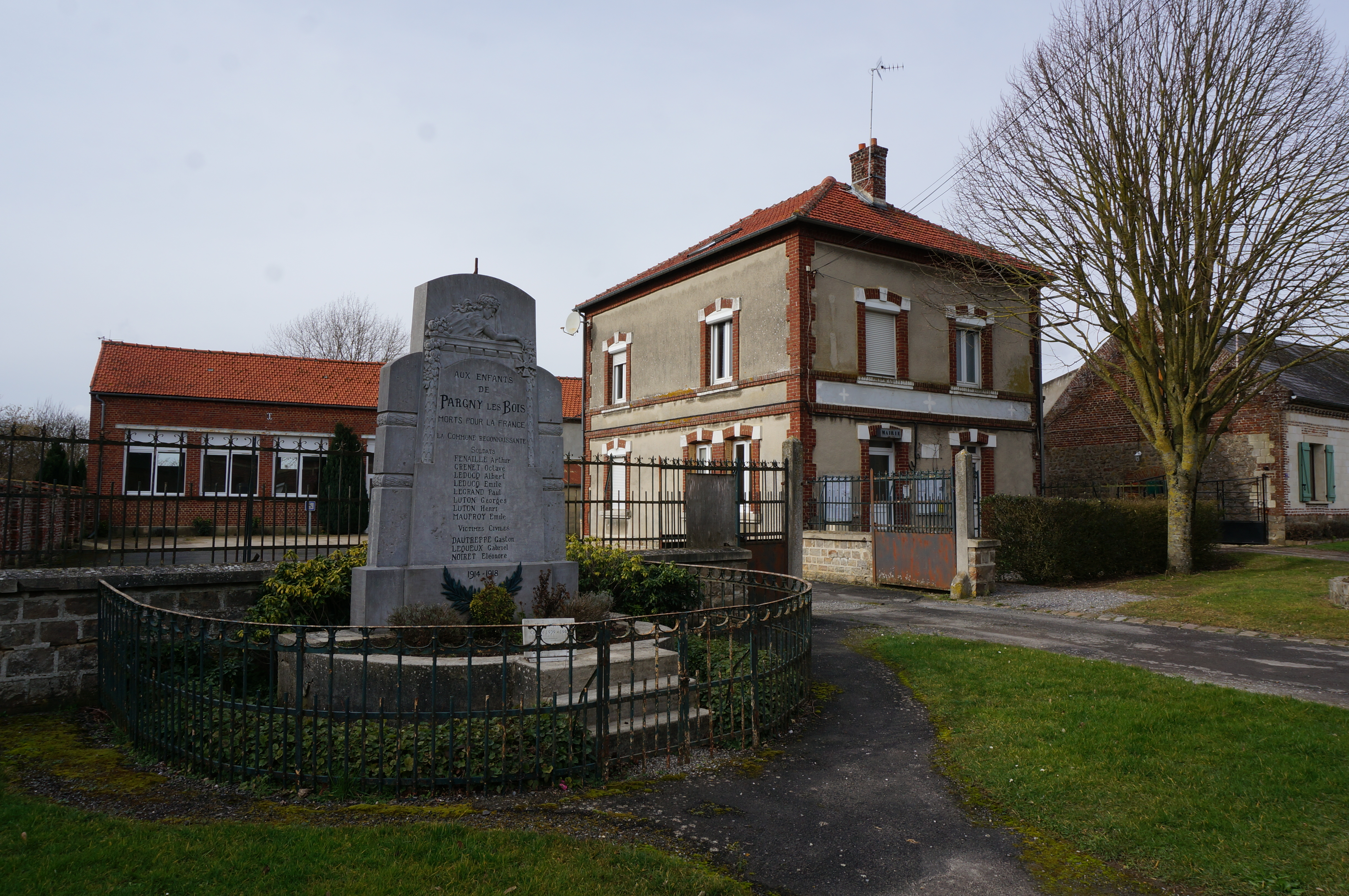
- The monument to the dead of Pargny-les-Bois
- Location of Pargny-les-Bois
- Location within France Location within Hauts-de-France
- Coordinates: 49°43′36″N 3°37′27″E
- Country: France
- Region: Hauts-de-France
- Department: Aisne
- Arrondissement: Laon
- Canton: Marle
- Intercommunality: Pays de la Serre

Government
  - Mayor (2026–32): Jean-Marc Talon
- Area^{1}: 6.83 km^{2} (2.64 sq mi)
- Elevation: 154 m (505 ft)
- Highest elevation: 137 m (449 ft)
- Lowest elevation: 81 m (266 ft)
- Population (2023): 142
  - Density: 20.8/km^{2} (53.8/sq mi)
- Time zone: UTC+01:00 (CET)
  - Summer (DST): UTC+02:00 (CEST)
- INSEE/Postal code: 02591 /02270
- ^{1} French Land Register data, which excludes lakes, ponds, glaciers > 1 km^{2} (0.386 sq mi or 247 acres) and river estuaries.

Pargny-les-Bois is a commune in the Aisne department in Hauts-de-France in northern France.

== Population ==
Historical population
Year	Pop.	±% p.a.
1968	153	—
1975	161	+0.73%
1982	139	−2.08%
1990	153	+1.21%
1999	137	−1.22%
2007	135	−0.18%
2012	131	−0.60%
2017	131	+0.00%
2023	142	+1.35%
Source: INSEE

== See also ==
- Communes of the Aisne department
