= Voyenne =

- Commune
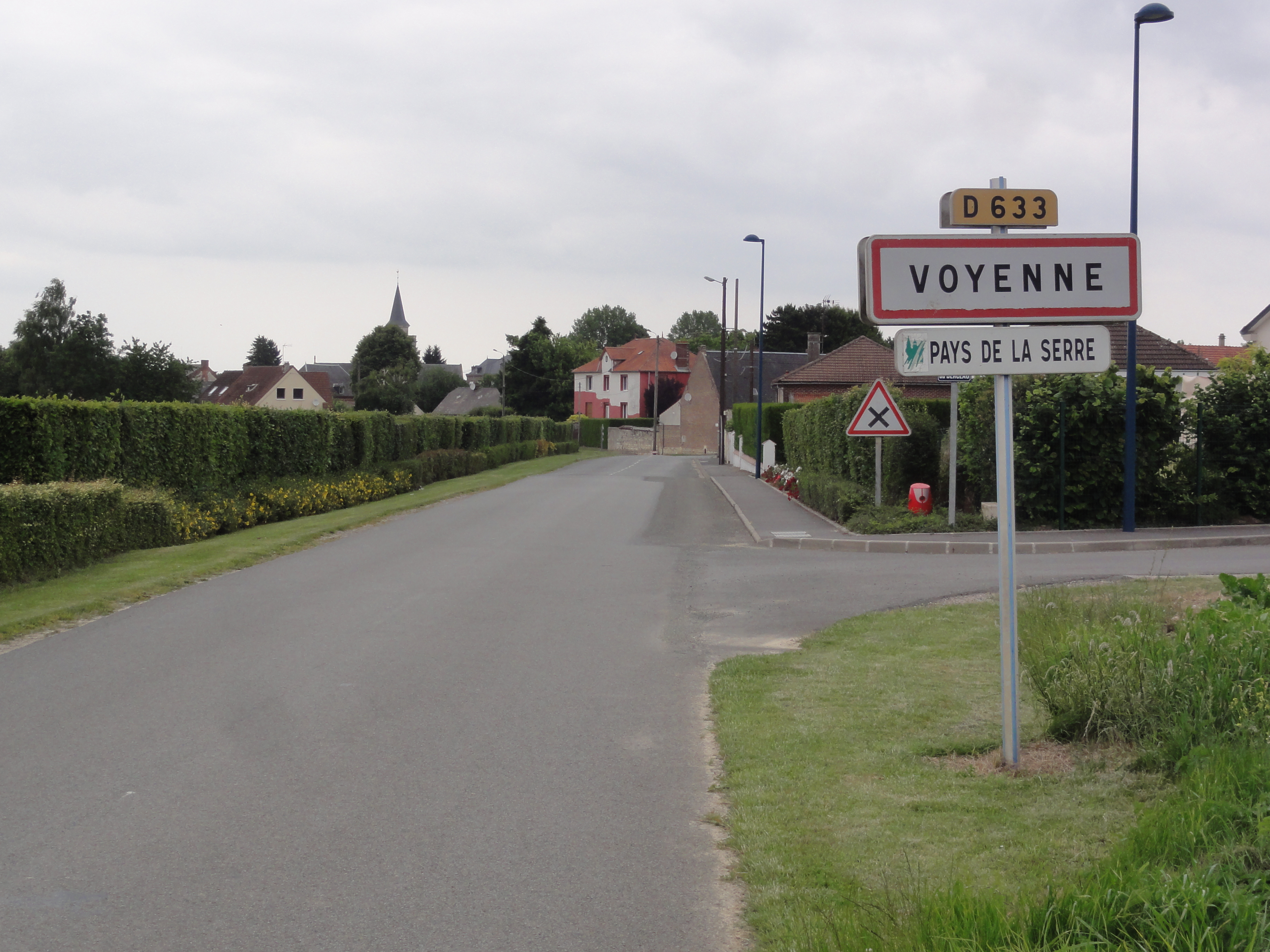
- The road into Voyenne
- Location of Voyenne
- Location within France Location within Hauts-de-France
- Coordinates: 49°43′31″N 3°43′54″E
- Country: France
- Region: Hauts-de-France
- Department: Aisne
- Arrondissement: Laon
- Canton: Marle
- Intercommunality: Pays de la Serre

Government
  - Mayor (2026–32): Jérémie Cochet
- Area^{1}: 13.97 km^{2} (5.39 sq mi)
- Elevation: 72 m (236 ft)
- Highest elevation: 136 m (446 ft)
- Lowest elevation: 66 m (217 ft)
- Population (2023): 312
  - Density: 22.3/km^{2} (57.8/sq mi)
- Time zone: UTC+01:00 (CET)
  - Summer (DST): UTC+02:00 (CEST)
- INSEE/Postal code: 02827 /02250
- ^{1} French Land Register data, which excludes lakes, ponds, glaciers > 1 km^{2} (0.386 sq mi or 247 acres) and river estuaries.

Voyenne is a commune in the Aisne department in Hauts-de-France in northern France.

== Population ==
Historical population
Year	Pop.	±% p.a.
1968	409	—
1975	362	−1.73%
1982	301	−2.60%
1990	266	−1.53%
1999	284	+0.73%
2007	281	−0.13%
2012	276	−0.36%
2017	324	+3.26%
2023	312	−0.63%
Source: INSEE

== See also ==
- Communes of the Aisne department
