= Bosmont-sur-Serre =

- Commune
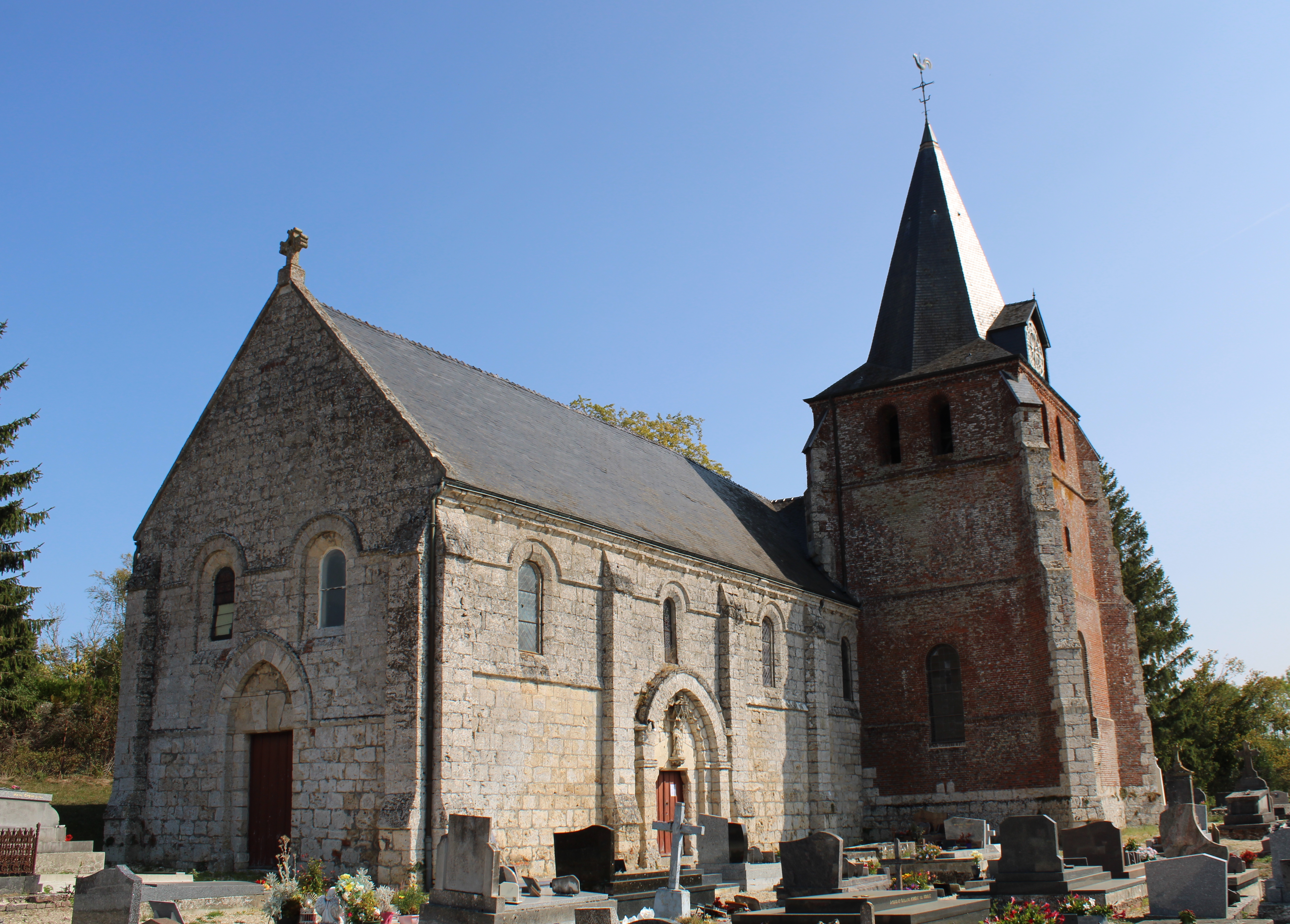
- The church of Bosmont-sur-Serre

- Coat of arms

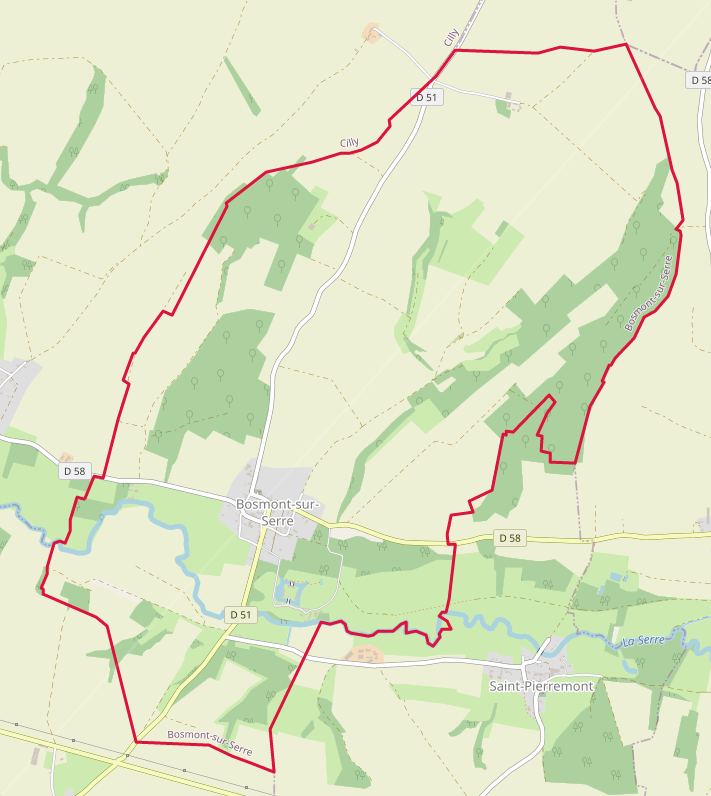
- Location of Bosmont-sur-Serre
- Location within France Location within Hauts-de-France
- Coordinates: 49°43′57″N 3°51′37″E
- Country: France
- Region: Hauts-de-France
- Department: Aisne
- Arrondissement: Laon
- Canton: Marle
- Intercommunality: Pays de la Serre

Government
  - Mayor (2026–32): Laurent Duchêne
- Area^{1}: 9.68 km^{2} (3.74 sq mi)
- Elevation: 85 m (279 ft)
- Highest elevation: 172 m (564 ft)
- Lowest elevation: 87 m (285 ft)
- Population (2023): 170
  - Density: 18/km^{2} (45/sq mi)
- Time zone: UTC+01:00 (CET)
  - Summer (DST): UTC+02:00 (CEST)
- INSEE/Postal code: 02101 /02250
- ^{1} French Land Register data, which excludes lakes, ponds, glaciers > 1 km^{2} (0.386 sq mi or 247 acres) and river estuaries.

Bosmont-sur-Serre (French pronunciation: [bomɔ̃ syʁ sɛʁ], literally Bosmont on Serre) is a commune in the department of Aisne in Hauts-de-France in northern France.

== Population ==
Historical population
Year	Pop.	±% p.a.
1968	313	—
1975	270	−2.09%
1982	251	−1.04%
1990	197	−2.98%
1999	190	−0.40%
2007	203	+0.83%
2012	204	+0.10%
2017	193	−1.10%
2023	170	−2.09%
Source: INSEE

== See also ==
- Communes of the Aisne department
