= Housset =

- Commune
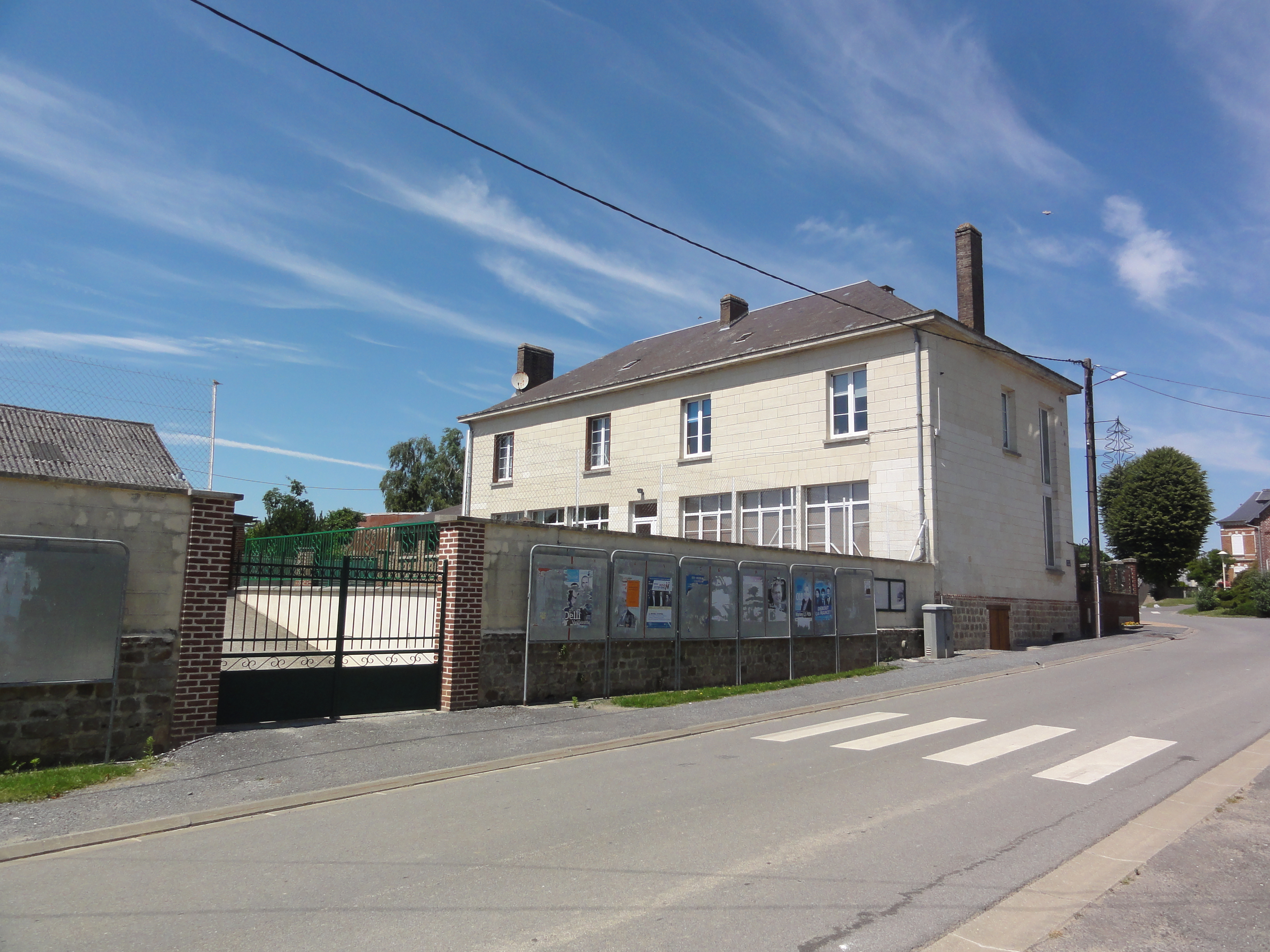
- The town hall and school of Housset
- Location of Housset
- Location within France Location within Hauts-de-France
- Coordinates: 49°47′42″N 3°42′31″E
- Country: France
- Region: Hauts-de-France
- Department: Aisne
- Arrondissement: Vervins
- Canton: Marle
- Intercommunality: Thiérache du Centre

Government
  - Mayor (2026–32): Romain Hivet
- Area^{1}: 13.2 km^{2} (5.1 sq mi)
- Elevation: 130 m (430 ft)
- Highest elevation: 157 m (515 ft)
- Lowest elevation: 85 m (279 ft)
- Population (2023): 170
  - Density: 13/km^{2} (33/sq mi)
- Time zone: UTC+01:00 (CET)
  - Summer (DST): UTC+02:00 (CEST)
- INSEE/Postal code: 02385 /02250
- ^{1} French Land Register data, which excludes lakes, ponds, glaciers > 1 km^{2} (0.386 sq mi or 247 acres) and river estuaries.

Housset (French pronunciation: [usɛ]) is a commune in the Aisne department in Hauts-de-France in northern France.

== Population ==
Historical population
Year	Pop.	±% p.a.
1968	262	—
1975	200	−3.78%
1982	172	−2.13%
1990	165	−0.52%
1999	193	+1.76%
2007	180	−0.87%
2012	168	−1.37%
2017	149	−2.37%
2023	170	+2.22%
Source: INSEE

== See also ==
- Communes of the Aisne department
