= Saint-Pierremont, Aisne =

Saint-Pierremont
- Commune
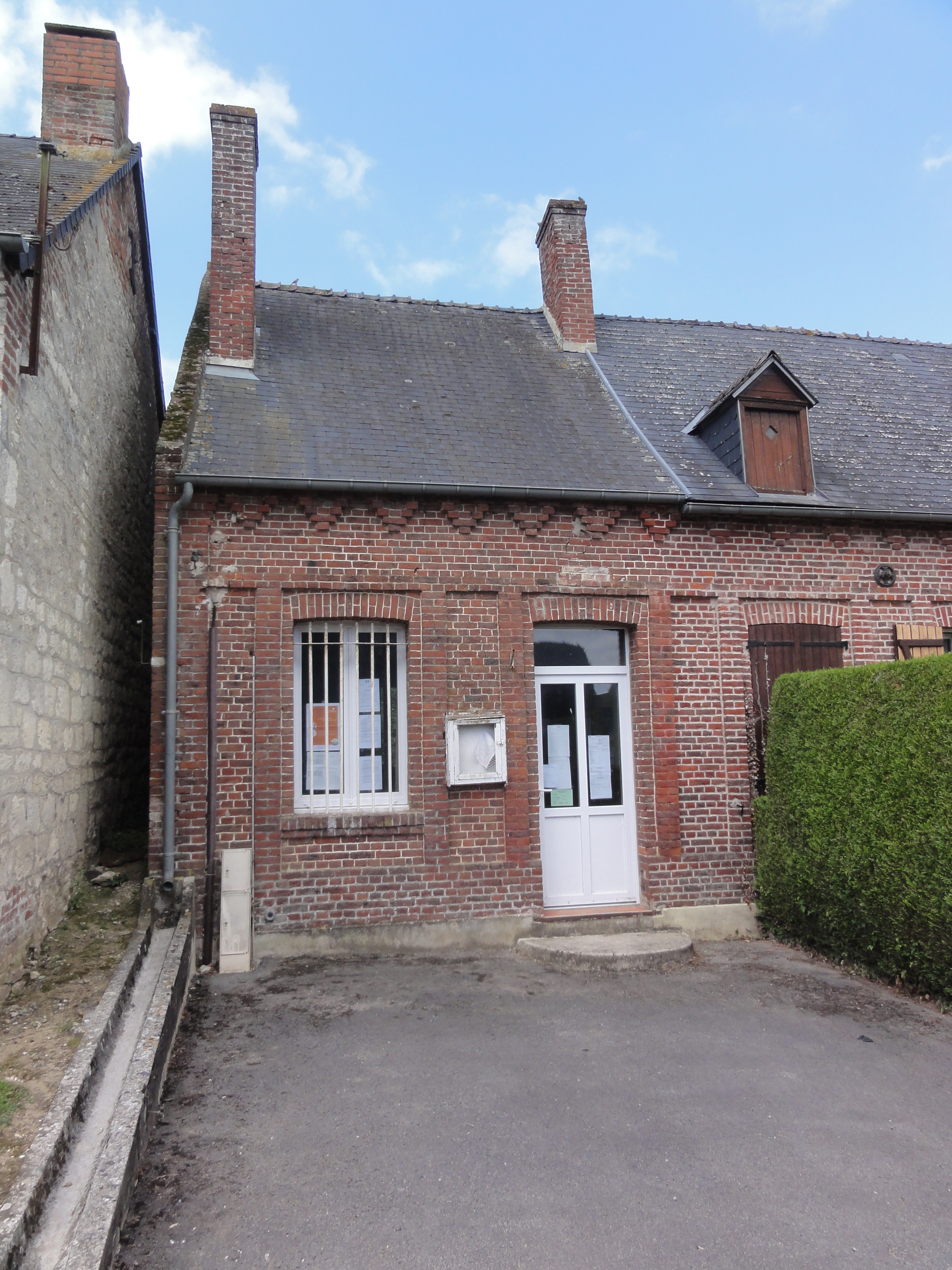
- The town hall of Saint-Pierremont
- Location of Saint-Pierremont
- Location within France Location within Hauts-de-France
- Coordinates: 49°43′22″N 3°52′55″E
- Country: France
- Region: Hauts-de-France
- Department: Aisne
- Arrondissement: Laon
- Canton: Marle
- Intercommunality: Pays de la Serre

Government
  - Mayor (2026–32): Marcel Lombard
- Area^{1}: 6.98 km^{2} (2.69 sq mi)
- Elevation: 142 m (466 ft)
- Highest elevation: 152 m (499 ft)
- Lowest elevation: 90 m (300 ft)
- Population (2023): 41
  - Density: 5.9/km^{2} (15/sq mi)
- Time zone: UTC+01:00 (CET)
  - Summer (DST): UTC+02:00 (CEST)
- INSEE/Postal code: 02689 /02250
- ^{1} French Land Register data, which excludes lakes, ponds, glaciers > 1 km^{2} (0.386 sq mi or 247 acres) and river estuaries.

Saint-Pierremont is a commune in the Aisne department in Hauts-de-France in northern France.

== Population ==
Historical population
Year	Pop.	±% p.a.
1968	86	—
1975	70	−2.90%
1982	64	−1.27%
1990	60	−0.80%
1999	62	+0.36%
2007	59	−0.62%
2012	53	−2.12%
2017	43	−4.10%
2023	41	−0.79%
Source: INSEE

== See also ==
- Communes of the Aisne department
