= Marfontaine =

- Commune
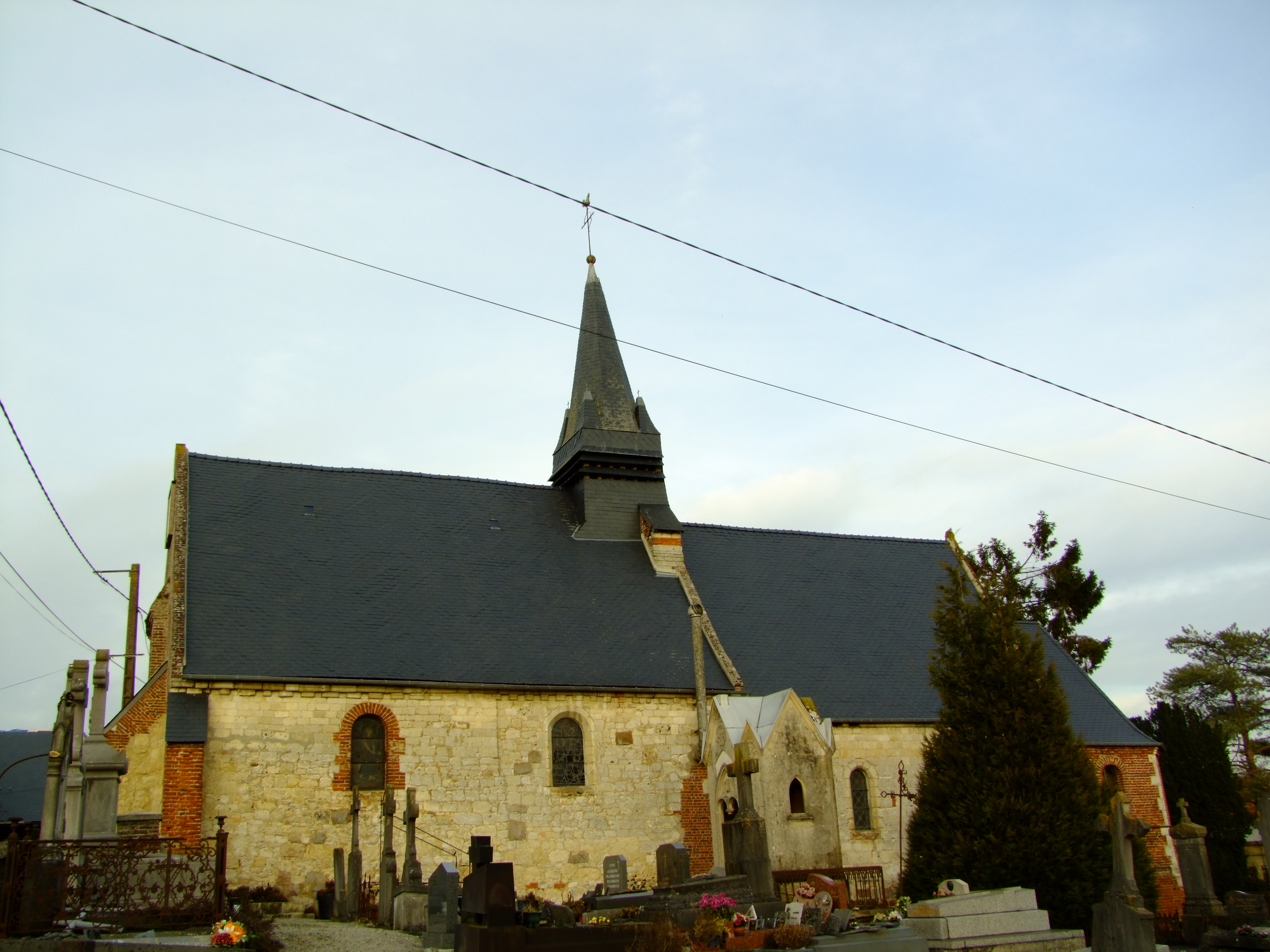
- The church of Marfontaine

- Coat of arms
- Location of Marfontaine
- Location within France Location within Hauts-de-France
- Coordinates: 49°48′16″N 3°46′14″E
- Country: France
- Region: Hauts-de-France
- Department: Aisne
- Arrondissement: Vervins
- Canton: Marle
- Intercommunality: Thiérache du Centre

Government
  - Mayor (2026–32): Ludovic Leclere
- Area^{1}: 9.21 km^{2} (3.56 sq mi)
- Elevation: 100 m (330 ft)
- Highest elevation: 171 m (561 ft)
- Lowest elevation: 99 m (325 ft)
- Population (2023): 83
  - Density: 9.0/km^{2} (23/sq mi)
- Time zone: UTC+01:00 (CET)
  - Summer (DST): UTC+02:00 (CEST)
- INSEE/Postal code: 02463 /02140
- ^{1} French Land Register data, which excludes lakes, ponds, glaciers > 1 km^{2} (0.386 sq mi or 247 acres) and river estuaries.

Marfontaine (French pronunciation: [maʁfɔ̃tɛn]) is a commune in the Aisne department in Hauts-de-France in northern France.

== Population ==
Historical population
Year	Pop.	±% p.a.
1968	144	—
1975	127	−1.78%
1982	76	−7.07%
1990	87	+1.70%
1999	88	+0.13%
2007	92	+0.56%
2012	79	−3.00%
2017	86	+1.71%
2023	83	−0.59%
Source: INSEE

== See also ==
- Communes of the Aisne department
