= Canton of Marle =

Coordinates: 49°43′N 3°46′E

Marle
- Canton
- Interactive map of Marle
- Country: France
- Region: Hauts-de-France
- Department: Aisne
- No. of communes: {{{nbcomm}}}
- Area: 627.64 km^{2} (242.33 sq mi)
- Population (2023): 19,297
  - Density: 30.745/km^{2} (79.630/sq mi)
- INSEE code: 02 11

The canton of Marle is an administrative division in northern France. At the French canton reorganisation which came into effect in March 2015, the canton was expanded from 23 to 65 communes:

1. Agnicourt-et-Séchelles
2. Assis-sur-Serre
3. Autremencourt
4. Barenton-Bugny
5. Barenton-Cel
6. Barenton-sur-Serre
7. Berlancourt
8. Bois-lès-Pargny
9. Bosmont-sur-Serre
10. Chalandry
11. Châtillon-lès-Sons
12. Chéry-lès-Pouilly
13. Chevennes
14. Cilly
15. Colonfay
16. Couvron-et-Aumencourt
17. Crécy-sur-Serre
18. Cuirieux
19. Dercy
20. Erlon
21. Franqueville
22. Froidmont-Cohartille
23. Grandlup-et-Fay
24. Le Hérie-la-Viéville
25. Housset
26. Landifay-et-Bertaignemont
27. Lemé
28. Lugny
29. Marcy-sous-Marle
30. Marfontaine
31. Marle
32. Mesbrecourt-Richecourt
33. Monceau-le-Neuf-et-Faucouzy
34. Monceau-le-Waast
35. Montigny-le-Franc
36. Montigny-sous-Marle
37. Montigny-sur-Crécy
38. Mortiers
39. La Neuville-Bosmont
40. La Neuville-Housset
41. Nouvion-et-Catillon
42. Nouvion-le-Comte
43. Pargny-les-Bois
44. Pierrepont
45. Pouilly-sur-Serre
46. Puisieux-et-Clanlieu
47. Remies
48. Rogny
49. Rougeries
50. Sains-Richaumont
51. Saint-Gobert
52. Saint-Pierre-lès-Franqueville
53. Saint-Pierremont
54. Sons-et-Ronchères
55. Le Sourd
56. Tavaux-et-Pontséricourt
57. Thiernu
58. Toulis-et-Attencourt
59. La Vallée-au-Blé
60. Verneuil-sur-Serre
61. Vesles-et-Caumont
62. Voharies
63. Voulpaix
64. Voyenne
65. Wiège-Faty

== Demographics ==
Historical population
Year	Pop.	±% p.a.
2013	20,233	—
2018	19,755	−0.48%
Source: INSEE

== See also ==
- Cantons of the Aisne department
- Communes of France
