= Cilly, Aisne =

Cilly
- Commune
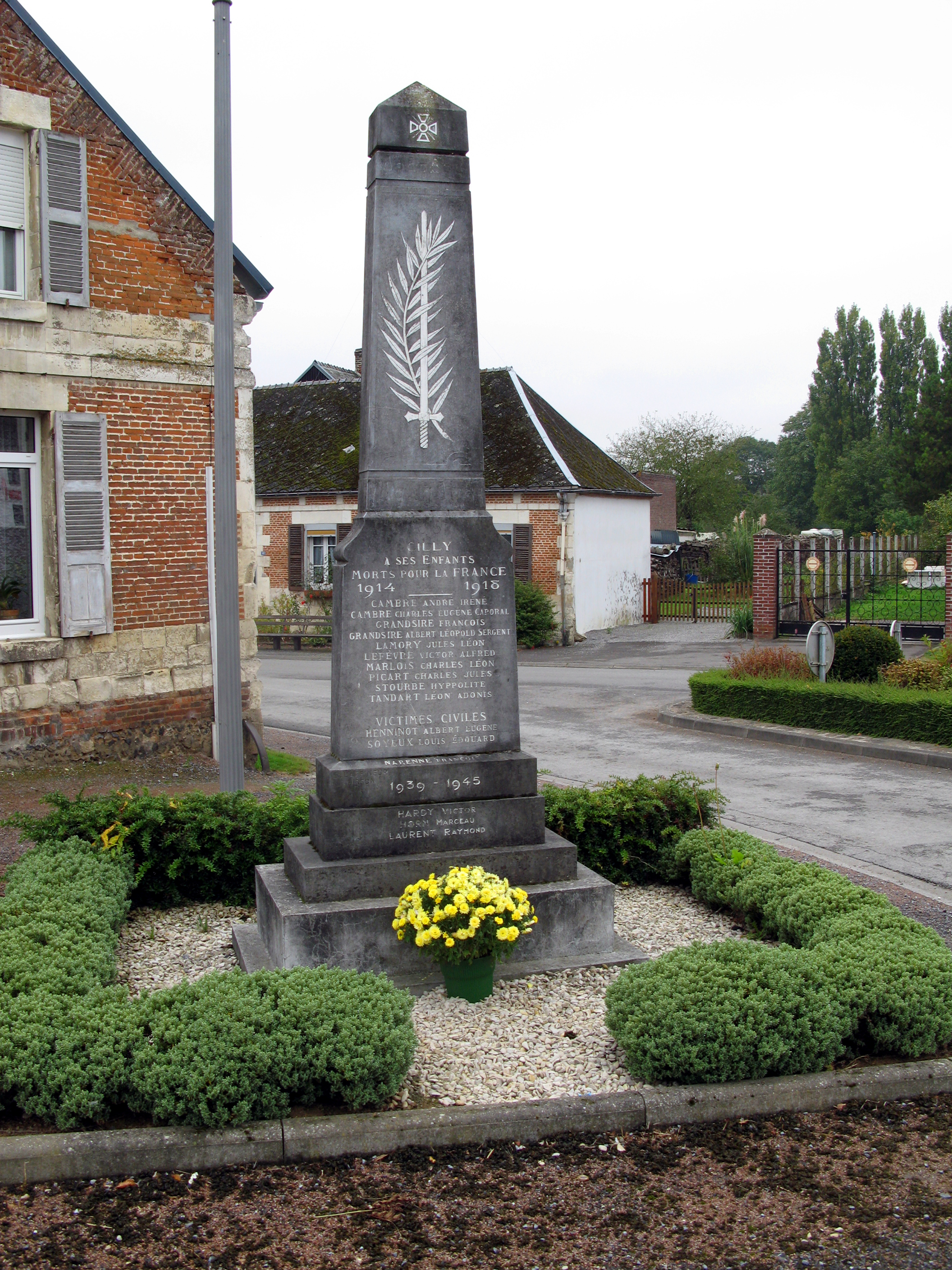
- War memorial
- Location of Cilly
- Location within France Location within Hauts-de-France
- Coordinates: 49°44′18″N 3°49′58″E
- Country: France
- Region: Hauts-de-France
- Department: Aisne
- Arrondissement: Laon
- Canton: Marle
- Intercommunality: Pays de la Serre

Government
  - Mayor (2026–32): Pierre-Jean Henninot
- Area^{1}: 9.3 km^{2} (3.6 sq mi)
- Elevation: 96 m (315 ft)
- Highest elevation: 167 m (548 ft)
- Lowest elevation: 81 m (266 ft)
- Population (2023): 173
  - Density: 19/km^{2} (48/sq mi)
- Time zone: UTC+01:00 (CET)
  - Summer (DST): UTC+02:00 (CEST)
- INSEE/Postal code: 02194 /02250
- ^{1} French Land Register data, which excludes lakes, ponds, glaciers > 1 km^{2} (0.386 sq mi or 247 acres) and river estuaries.

Cilly is a commune in the Aisne department in Hauts-de-France in northern France.

== Population ==
Historical population
Year	Pop.	±% p.a.
1968	344	—
1975	251	−4.40%
1982	251	+0.00%
1990	265	+0.68%
1999	246	−0.82%
2007	224	−1.16%
2012	223	−0.09%
2017	193	−2.85%
2023	173	−1.81%
Source: INSEE

== See also ==
- Communes of the Aisne department
