= Rougeries =

- Commune
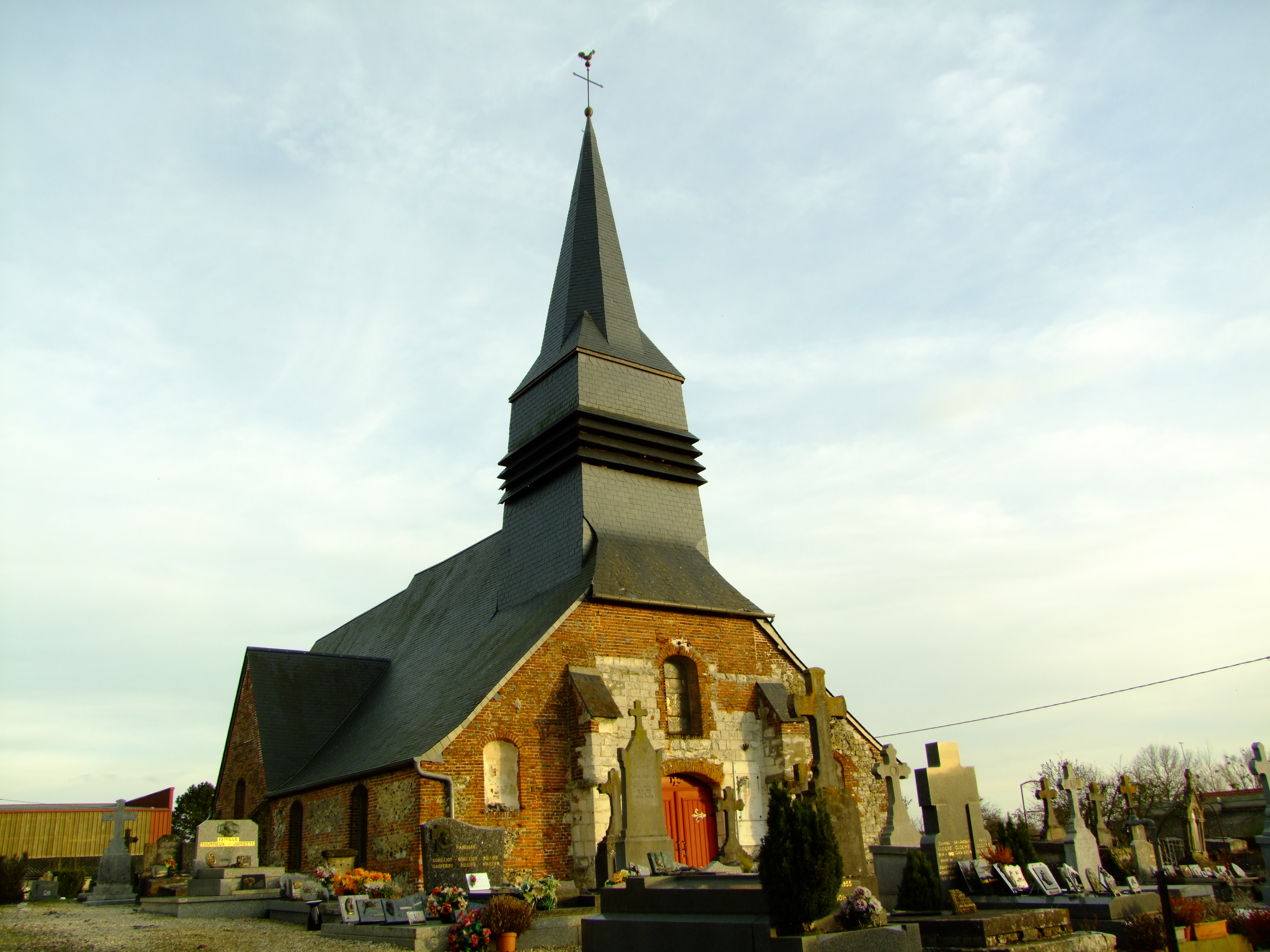
- The church of Rougeries

- Coat of arms
- Location of Rougeries
- Location within France Location within Hauts-de-France
- Coordinates: 49°48′14″N 3°47′15″E
- Country: France
- Region: Hauts-de-France
- Department: Aisne
- Arrondissement: Vervins
- Canton: Marle
- Intercommunality: Thiérache du Centre

Government
  - Mayor (2026–32): Olivier Lamendin
- Area^{1}: 4.13 km^{2} (1.59 sq mi)
- Elevation: 104 m (341 ft)
- Highest elevation: 173 m (568 ft)
- Lowest elevation: 95 m (312 ft)
- Population (2023): 200
  - Density: 48/km^{2} (130/sq mi)
- Time zone: UTC+01:00 (CET)
  - Summer (DST): UTC+02:00 (CEST)
- INSEE/Postal code: 02657 /02140
- ^{1} French Land Register data, which excludes lakes, ponds, glaciers > 1 km^{2} (0.386 sq mi or 247 acres) and river estuaries.

Rougeries (French pronunciation: [ʁuʒʁi]) is a commune in the Aisne department in Hauts-de-France in northern France.

== Population ==
Historical population
Year	Pop.	±% p.a.
1968	281	—
1975	288	+0.35%
1982	294	+0.29%
1990	257	−1.67%
1999	241	−0.71%
2007	230	−0.58%
2012	227	−0.26%
2017	243	+1.37%
2023	200	−3.19%
Source: INSEE

== See also ==
- Communes of the Aisne department
