= La Neuville-Housset =

- Commune
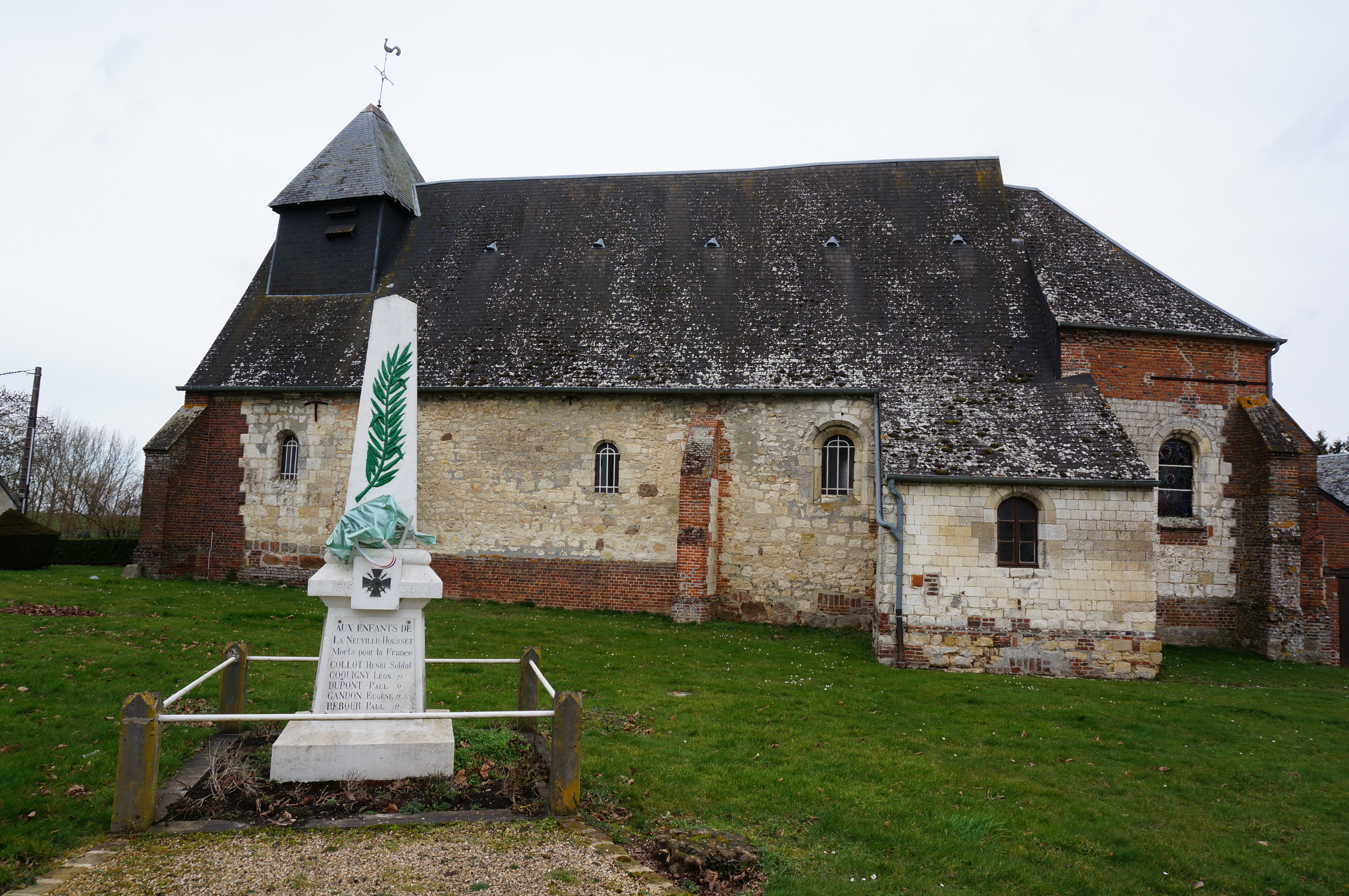
- The church of Housset
- Location of La Neuville-Housset
- Location within France Location within Hauts-de-France
- Coordinates: 49°47′32″N 3°43′46″E
- Country: France
- Region: Hauts-de-France
- Department: Aisne
- Arrondissement: Vervins
- Canton: Marle
- Intercommunality: Thiérache du Centre

Government
  - Mayor (2026–32): Laurence Chatelain
- Area^{1}: 4.99 km^{2} (1.93 sq mi)
- Elevation: 126 m (413 ft)
- Highest elevation: 157 m (515 ft)
- Lowest elevation: 113 m (371 ft)
- Population (2023): 61
  - Density: 12/km^{2} (32/sq mi)
- Time zone: UTC+01:00 (CET)
  - Summer (DST): UTC+02:00 (CEST)
- INSEE/Postal code: 02547 /02250
- ^{1} French Land Register data, which excludes lakes, ponds, glaciers > 1 km^{2} (0.386 sq mi or 247 acres) and river estuaries.

La Neuville-Housset (French pronunciation: [la nøvil usɛ]) is a commune in the Aisne department in Hauts-de-France in northern France.

== Population ==
Historical population
Year	Pop.	±% p.a.
1968	95	—
1975	62	−5.91%
1982	66	+0.90%
1990	63	−0.58%
1999	50	−2.54%
2007	63	+2.93%
2012	62	−0.32%
2017	67	+1.56%
2023	61	−1.55%
Source: INSEE

== See also ==
- Communes of the Aisne department
