= Saint-Gobert =

- Commune
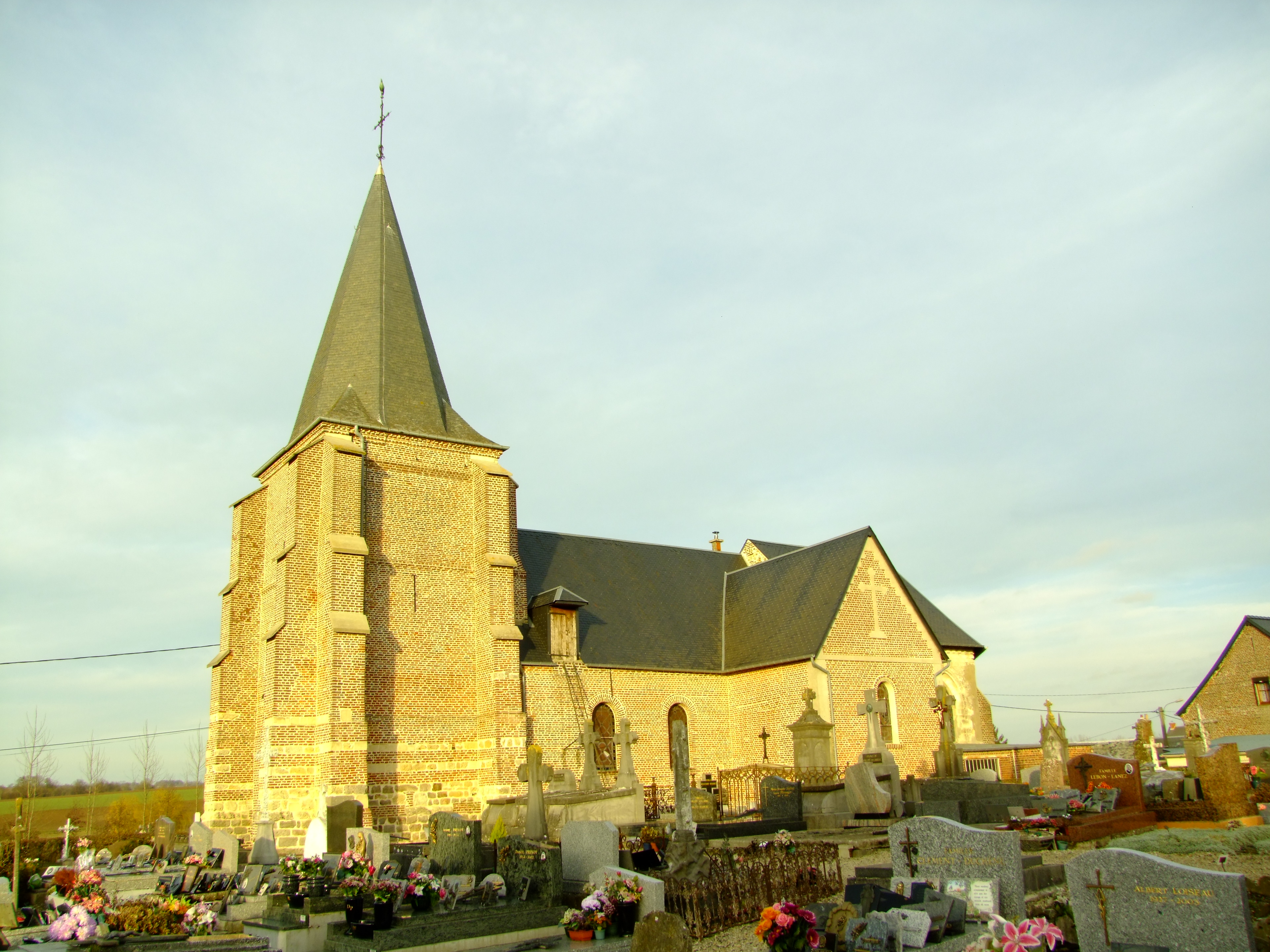
- The church of Saint-Gobert
- Location of Saint-Gobert
- Location within France Location within Hauts-de-France
- Coordinates: 49°48′08″N 3°49′00″E
- Country: France
- Region: Hauts-de-France
- Department: Aisne
- Arrondissement: Vervins
- Canton: Marle
- Intercommunality: Thiérache du Centre

Government
  - Mayor (2026–32): Luc Tavergnier
- Area^{1}: 7.78 km^{2} (3.00 sq mi)
- Elevation: 105 m (344 ft)
- Highest elevation: 177 m (581 ft)
- Lowest elevation: 97 m (318 ft)
- Population (2023): 281
  - Density: 36.1/km^{2} (93.5/sq mi)
- Time zone: UTC+01:00 (CET)
  - Summer (DST): UTC+02:00 (CEST)
- INSEE/Postal code: 02681 /02140
- ^{1} French Land Register data, which excludes lakes, ponds, glaciers > 1 km^{2} (0.386 sq mi or 247 acres) and river estuaries.

Saint-Gobert (French pronunciation: [sɛ̃ ɡɔbɛʁ]) is a commune in the Aisne department in Hauts-de-France in northern France.

== Population ==
Historical population
Year	Pop.	±% p.a.
1968	394	—
1975	341	−2.04%
1982	338	−0.13%
1990	312	−1.00%
1999	320	+0.28%
2007	307	−0.52%
2012	299	−0.53%
2017	267	−2.24%
2023	281	+0.86%
Source: INSEE

== See also ==
- Communes of the Aisne department
