= Chevennes =

- Commune
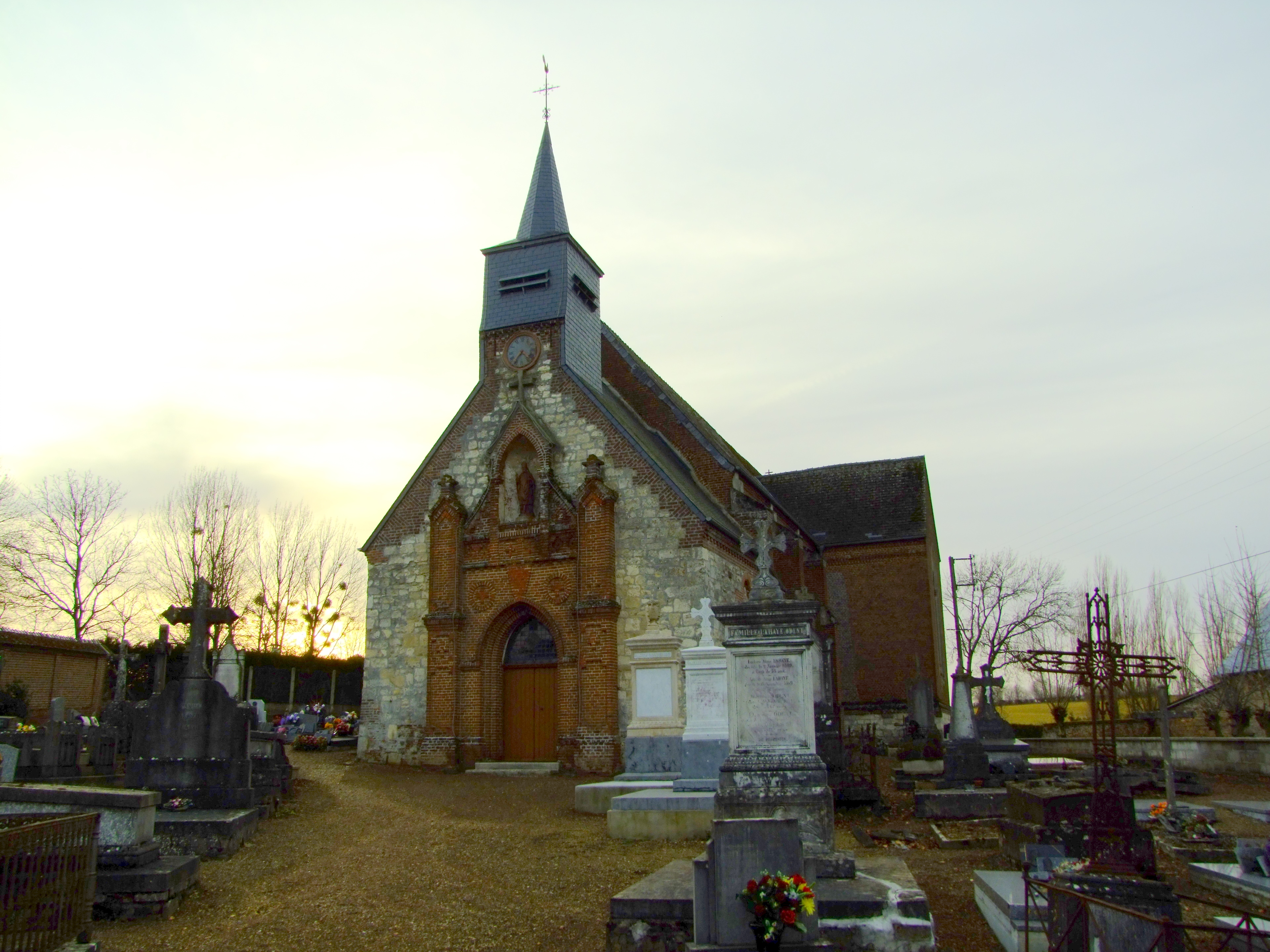
- The church of Chevennes

- Coat of arms
- Location of Chevennes
- Location within France Location within Hauts-de-France
- Coordinates: 49°48′57″N 3°44′00″E
- Country: France
- Region: Hauts-de-France
- Department: Aisne
- Arrondissement: Vervins
- Canton: Marle
- Intercommunality: Thiérache du Centre

Government
  - Mayor (2026–32): Théo Boitte
- Area^{1}: 6.06 km^{2} (2.34 sq mi)
- Elevation: 124 m (407 ft)
- Highest elevation: 161 m (528 ft)
- Lowest elevation: 115 m (377 ft)
- Population (2023): 136
  - Density: 22.4/km^{2} (58.1/sq mi)
- Time zone: UTC+01:00 (CET)
  - Summer (DST): UTC+02:00 (CEST)
- INSEE/Postal code: 02182 /02250
- ^{1} French Land Register data, which excludes lakes, ponds, glaciers > 1 km^{2} (0.386 sq mi or 247 acres) and river estuaries.

Chevennes (French pronunciation: [ʃəvɛn]) is a commune in the Aisne department in Hauts-de-France in northern France.

== Population ==
Historical population
Year	Pop.	±% p.a.
1968	157	—
1975	132	−2.45%
1982	146	+1.45%
1990	136	−0.88%
1999	155	+1.46%
2007	142	−1.09%
2012	140	−0.28%
2017	125	−2.24%
2023	136	+1.42%
Source: INSEE

== See also ==
- Communes of the Aisne department
