= Le Sourd =

- Commune
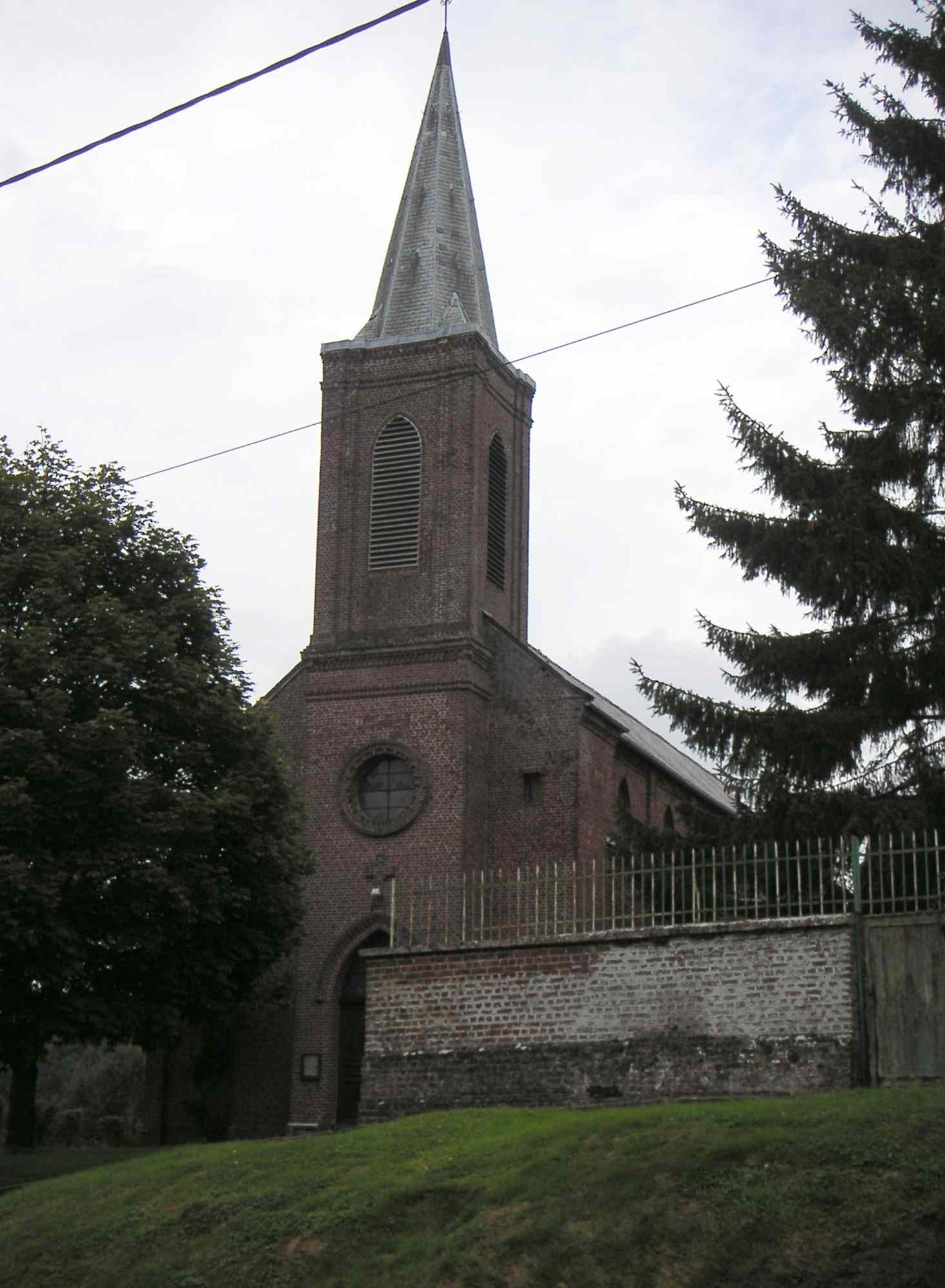
- The church of Le Sourd
- Location of Le Sourd
- Location within France Location within Hauts-de-France
- Coordinates: 49°51′42″N 3°44′57″E
- Country: France
- Region: Hauts-de-France
- Department: Aisne
- Arrondissement: Vervins
- Canton: Marle
- Intercommunality: Thiérache du Centre

Government
  - Mayor (2026–32): Jean-Jacques Jorand
- Area^{1}: 7.36 km^{2} (2.84 sq mi)
- Elevation: 160 m (520 ft)
- Highest elevation: 176 m (577 ft)
- Lowest elevation: 127 m (417 ft)
- Population (2023): 155
  - Density: 21.1/km^{2} (54.5/sq mi)
- Time zone: UTC+01:00 (CET)
  - Summer (DST): UTC+02:00 (CEST)
- INSEE/Postal code: 02731 /02140
- ^{1} French Land Register data, which excludes lakes, ponds, glaciers > 1 km^{2} (0.386 sq mi or 247 acres) and river estuaries.

Le Sourd (French pronunciation: [lə suʁ]) is a commune in the Aisne department in Hauts-de-France in northern France.

== Population ==
Historical population
Year	Pop.	±% p.a.
1968	240	—
1975	200	−2.57%
1982	172	−2.13%
1990	161	−0.82%
1999	152	−0.64%
2007	163	+0.88%
2012	165	+0.24%
2017	168	+0.36%
2023	155	−1.33%
Source: INSEE

== See also ==
- Communes of the Aisne department
