= Franqueville, Aisne =

Franqueville
- Commune
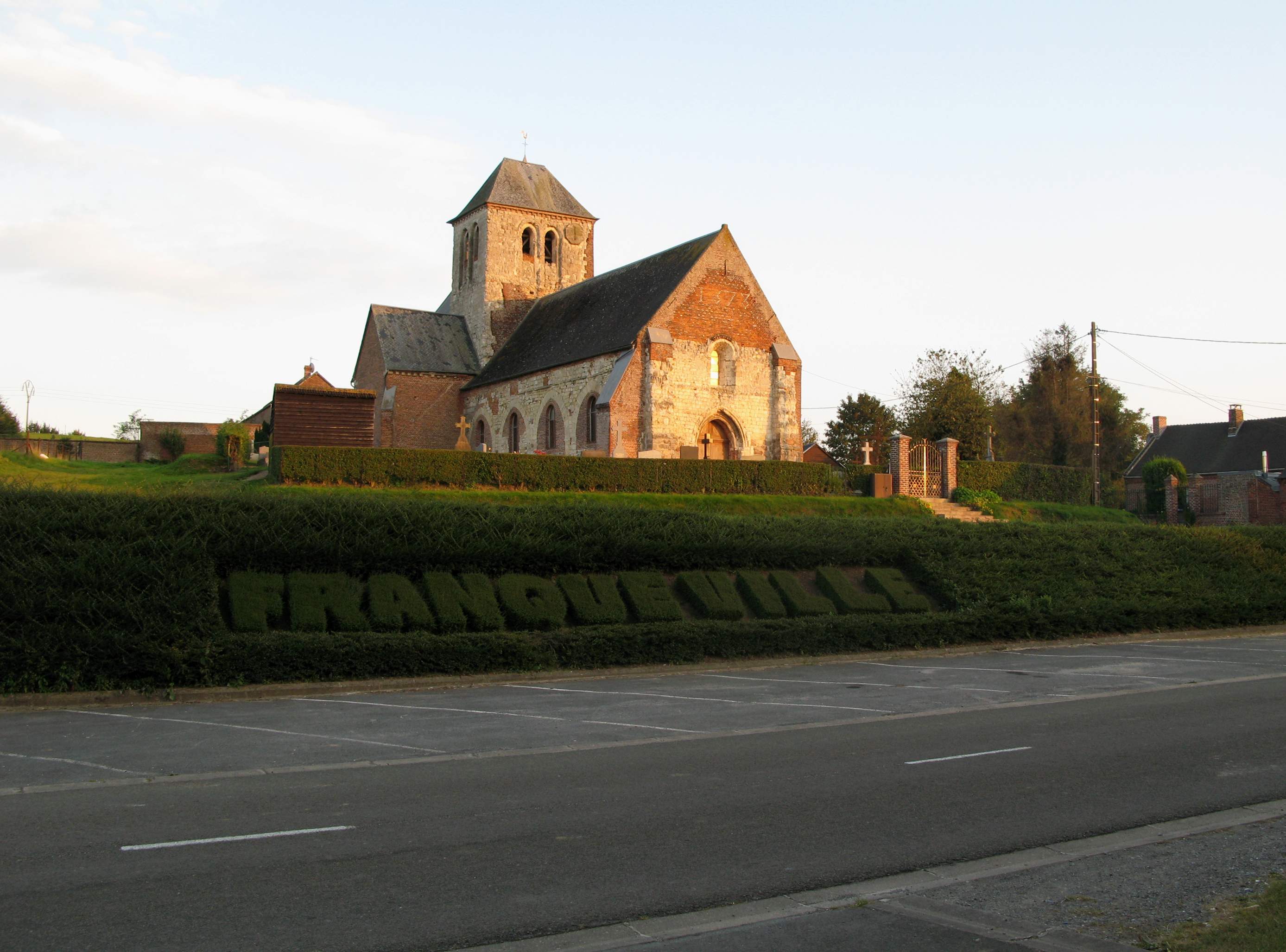
- The church of Franqueville

- Coat of arms
- Location of Franqueville
- Location within France Location within Hauts-de-France
- Coordinates: 49°48′39″N 3°48′37″E
- Country: France
- Region: Hauts-de-France
- Department: Aisne
- Arrondissement: Vervins
- Canton: Marle
- Intercommunality: Thiérache du Centre

Government
  - Mayor (2026–32): Guy Lemoine
- Area^{1}: 3.04 km^{2} (1.17 sq mi)
- Elevation: 285 m (935 ft)
- Highest elevation: 172 m (564 ft)
- Lowest elevation: 99 m (325 ft)
- Population (2023): 106
  - Density: 34.9/km^{2} (90.3/sq mi)
- Time zone: UTC+01:00 (CET)
  - Summer (DST): UTC+02:00 (CEST)
- INSEE/Postal code: 02331 /02140
- ^{1} French Land Register data, which excludes lakes, ponds, glaciers > 1 km^{2} (0.386 sq mi or 247 acres) and river estuaries.

Franqueville (French pronunciation: [fʁɑ̃kvil]) is a commune in the Aisne department in Hauts-de-France in northern France.

== Population ==
Historical population
Year	Pop.	±% p.a.
1968	157	—
1975	141	−1.52%
1982	134	−0.72%
1990	113	−2.11%
1999	123	+0.95%
2007	125	+0.20%
2012	127	+0.32%
2017	113	−2.31%
2023	106	−1.06%
Source: INSEE

== See also ==
- Communes of the Aisne department
