= Colonfay =

- Commune
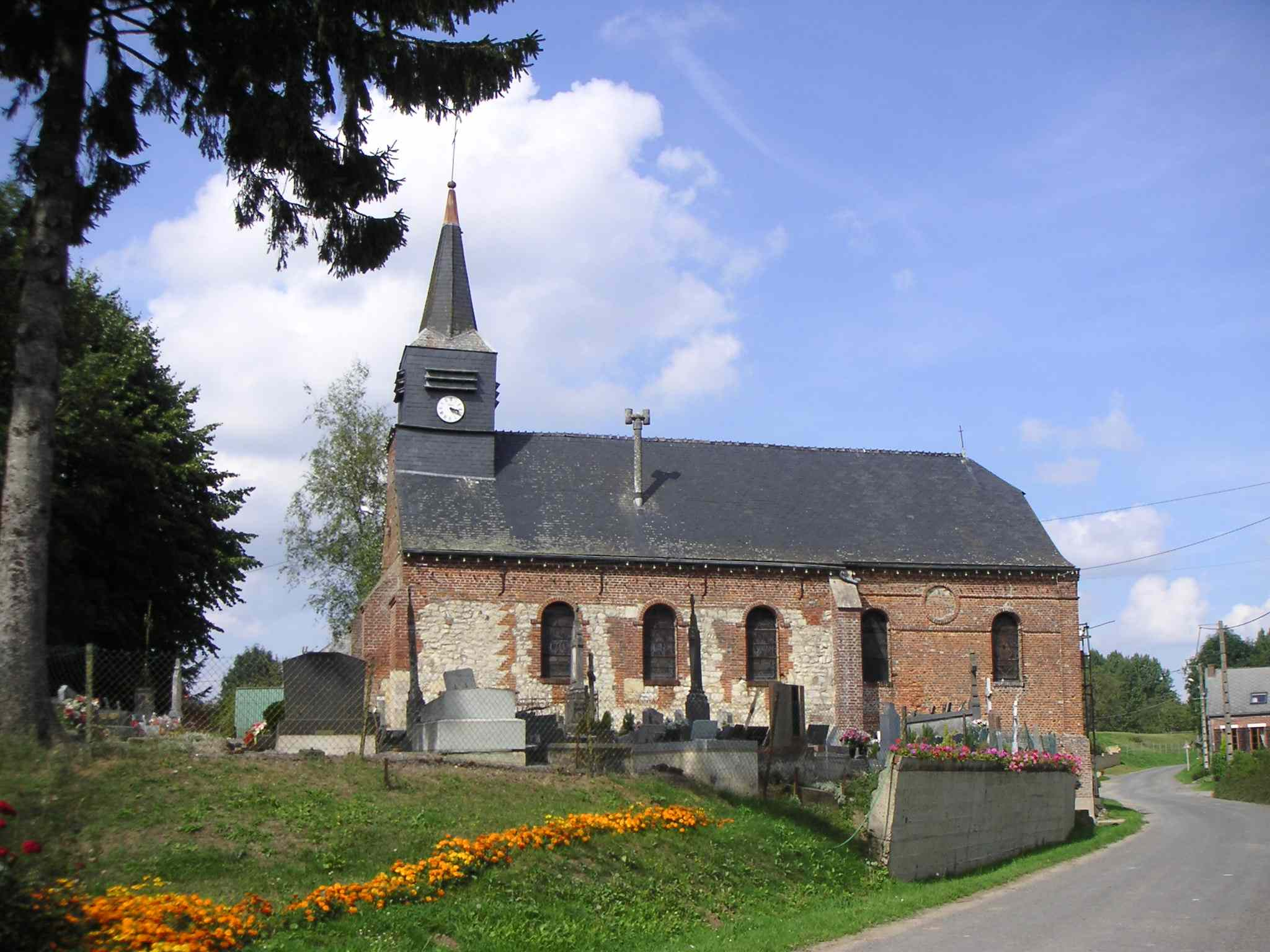
- The church of Colonfay
- Location of Colonfay
- Location within France Location within Hauts-de-France
- Coordinates: 49°51′32″N 3°42′48″E
- Country: France
- Region: Hauts-de-France
- Department: Aisne
- Arrondissement: Vervins
- Canton: Marle
- Intercommunality: Thiérache du Centre

Government
  - Mayor (2026–32): Michel Bourgeois
- Area^{1}: 3.29 km^{2} (1.27 sq mi)
- Elevation: 169 m (554 ft)
- Highest elevation: 162 m (531 ft)
- Lowest elevation: 135 m (443 ft)
- Population (2023): 71
  - Density: 22/km^{2} (56/sq mi)
- Time zone: UTC+01:00 (CET)
  - Summer (DST): UTC+02:00 (CEST)
- INSEE/Postal code: 02206 /02120
- ^{1} French Land Register data, which excludes lakes, ponds, glaciers > 1 km^{2} (0.386 sq mi or 247 acres) and river estuaries.

Colonfay (French pronunciation: [kɔlɔ̃fɛ]) is a commune in the Aisne department in Hauts-de-France in northern France.

== Population ==
Historical population
Year	Pop.	±% p.a.
1968	96	—
1975	77	−3.10%
1982	72	−0.95%
1990	86	+2.25%
1999	95	+1.11%
2007	68	−4.09%
2012	81	+3.56%
2017	78	−0.75%
2023	71	−1.55%
Source: INSEE

== See also ==
- Communes of the Aisne department
