= Voharies =

- Commune
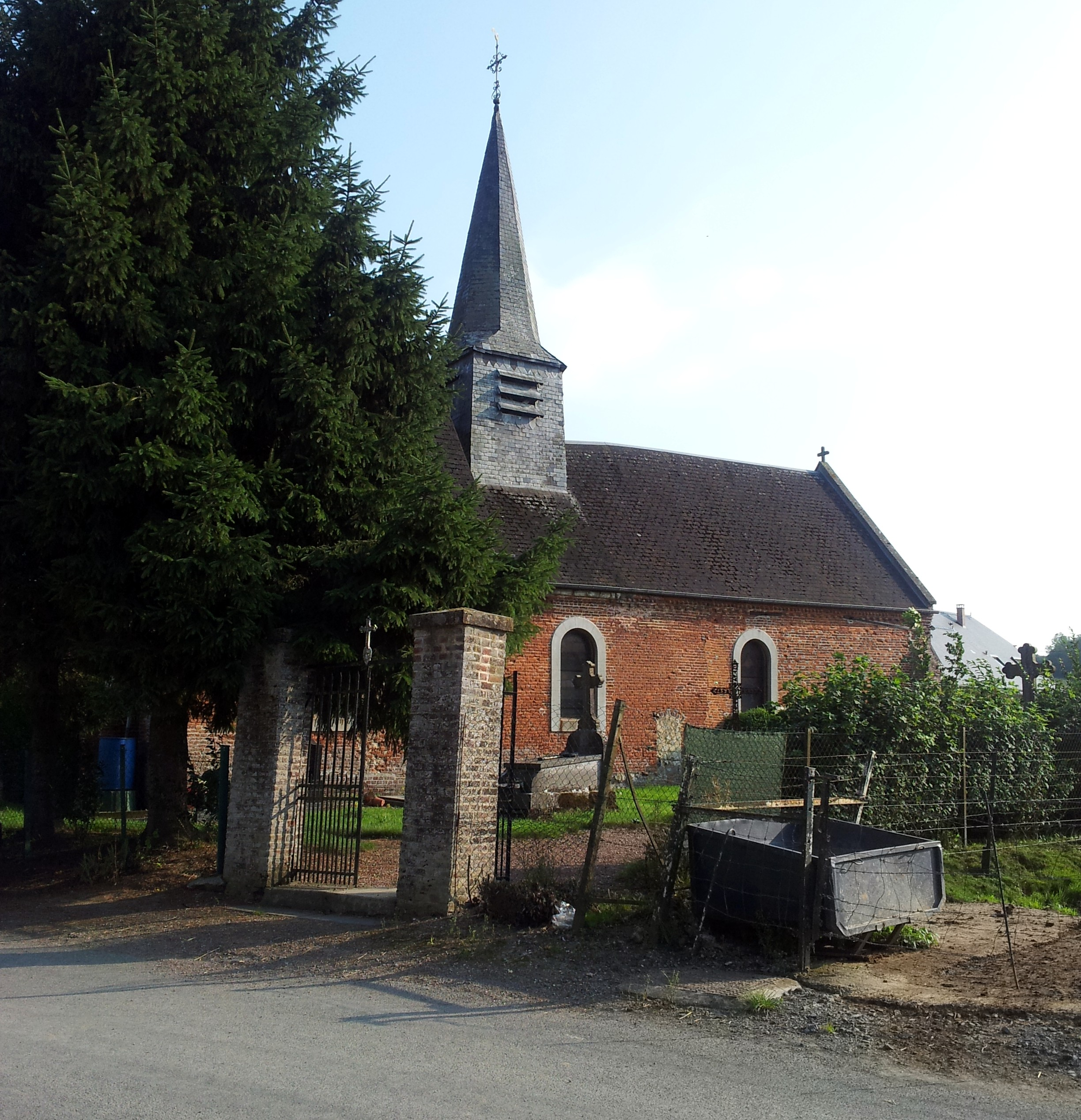
- The church of Voharies
- Location of Voharies
- Location within France Location within Hauts-de-France
- Coordinates: 49°47′21″N 3°47′44″E
- Country: France
- Region: Hauts-de-France
- Department: Aisne
- Arrondissement: Vervins
- Canton: Marle
- Intercommunality: Thiérache du Centre

Government
  - Mayor (2026–32): Jérôme Desestre
- Area^{1}: 3.32 km^{2} (1.28 sq mi)
- Elevation: 105 m (344 ft)
- Highest elevation: 156 m (512 ft)
- Lowest elevation: 87 m (285 ft)
- Population (2023): 70
  - Density: 21/km^{2} (55/sq mi)
- Time zone: UTC+01:00 (CET)
  - Summer (DST): UTC+02:00 (CEST)
- INSEE/Postal code: 02823 /02140
- ^{1} French Land Register data, which excludes lakes, ponds, glaciers > 1 km^{2} (0.386 sq mi or 247 acres) and river estuaries.

Voharies (French pronunciation: [vɔaʁi]) is a commune in the Aisne department in Hauts-de-France in northern France.

== Population ==
Historical population
| Year | Pop. | ±% p.a. |
|---|---|---|
| 1968 | 149 | — |
| 1975 | 126 | −2.37% |
| 1982 | 98 | −3.53% |
| 1990 | 78 | −2.81% |
| 1999 | 78 | +0.00% |
| 2007 | 72 | −1.00% |
| 2012 | 69 | −0.85% |
| 2017 | 73 | +1.13% |
| 2023 | 70 | −0.70% |
Source: INSEE

== See also ==
- Communes of the Aisne department
