= Landifay-et-Bertaignemont =

- Commune
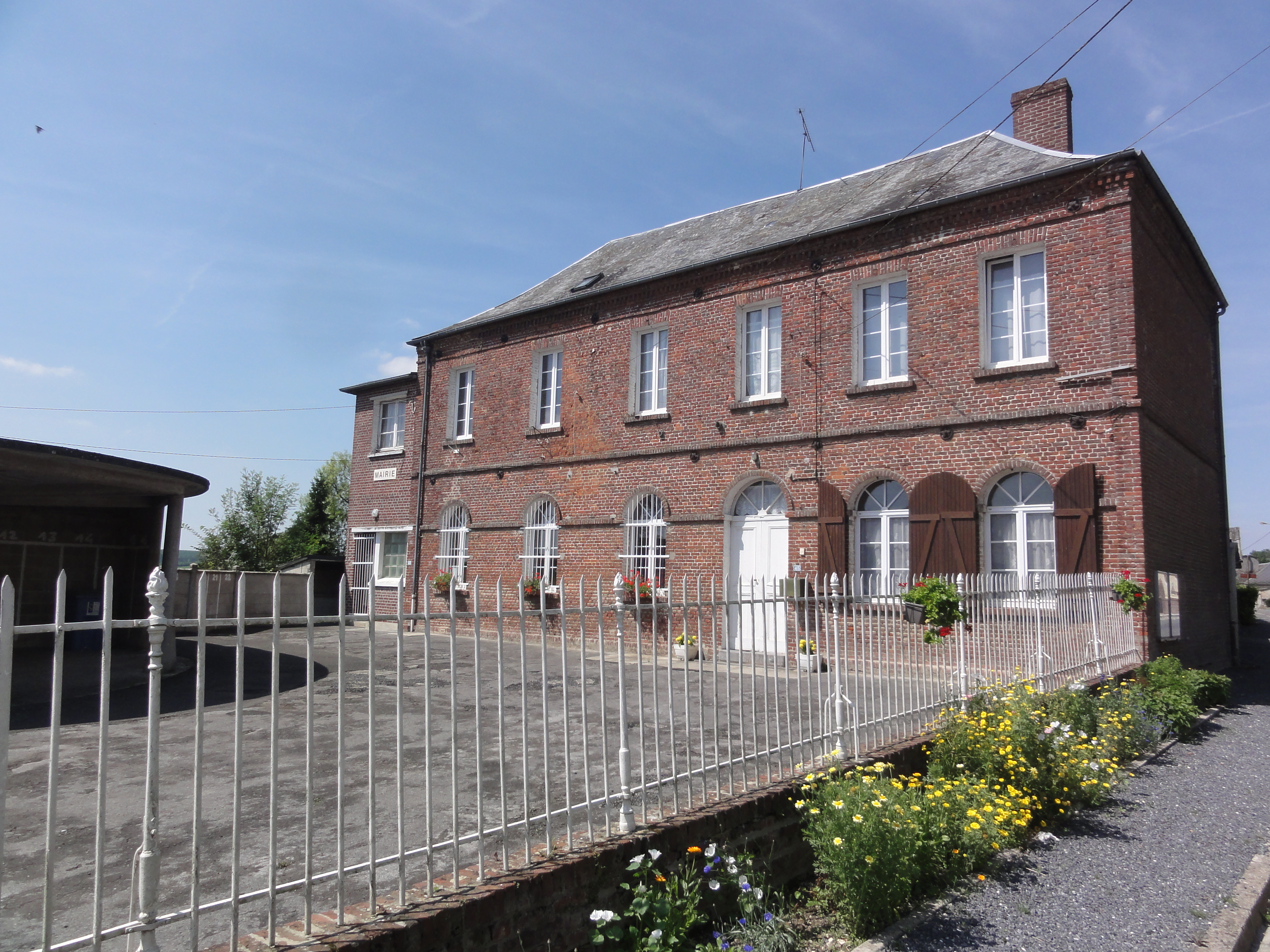
- The town hall of Landifay-et-Bertaignemont
- Location of Landifay-et-Bertaignemont
- Location within France Location within Hauts-de-France
- Coordinates: 49°49′04″N 3°36′25″E
- Country: France
- Region: Hauts-de-France
- Department: Aisne
- Arrondissement: Vervins
- Canton: Marle
- Intercommunality: Thiérache du Centre

Government
  - Mayor (2026–32): Sandrine Beaud'Huin-Louis
- Area^{1}: 19.6 km^{2} (7.6 sq mi)
- Elevation: 113 m (371 ft)
- Highest elevation: 153 m (502 ft)
- Lowest elevation: 77 m (253 ft)
- Population (2023): 241
  - Density: 12.3/km^{2} (31.8/sq mi)
- Time zone: UTC+01:00 (CET)
  - Summer (DST): UTC+02:00 (CEST)
- INSEE/Postal code: 02403 /02120
- ^{1} French Land Register data, which excludes lakes, ponds, glaciers > 1 km^{2} (0.386 sq mi or 247 acres) and river estuaries.

Landifay-et-Bertaignemont is a commune in the Aisne department in Hauts-de-France in northern France.

== Population ==
Historical population
| Year | Pop. | ±% p.a. |
|---|---|---|
| 1968 | 482 | — |
| 1975 | 389 | −3.02% |
| 1982 | 339 | −1.95% |
| 1990 | 312 | −1.03% |
| 1999 | 277 | −1.31% |
| 2007 | 296 | +0.83% |
| 2012 | 285 | −0.75% |
| 2017 | 269 | −1.15% |
| 2023 | 241 | −1.82% |
Source: INSEE

== See also ==
- Communes of the Aisne department
