= Saint-Pierre-lès-Franqueville =

- Commune
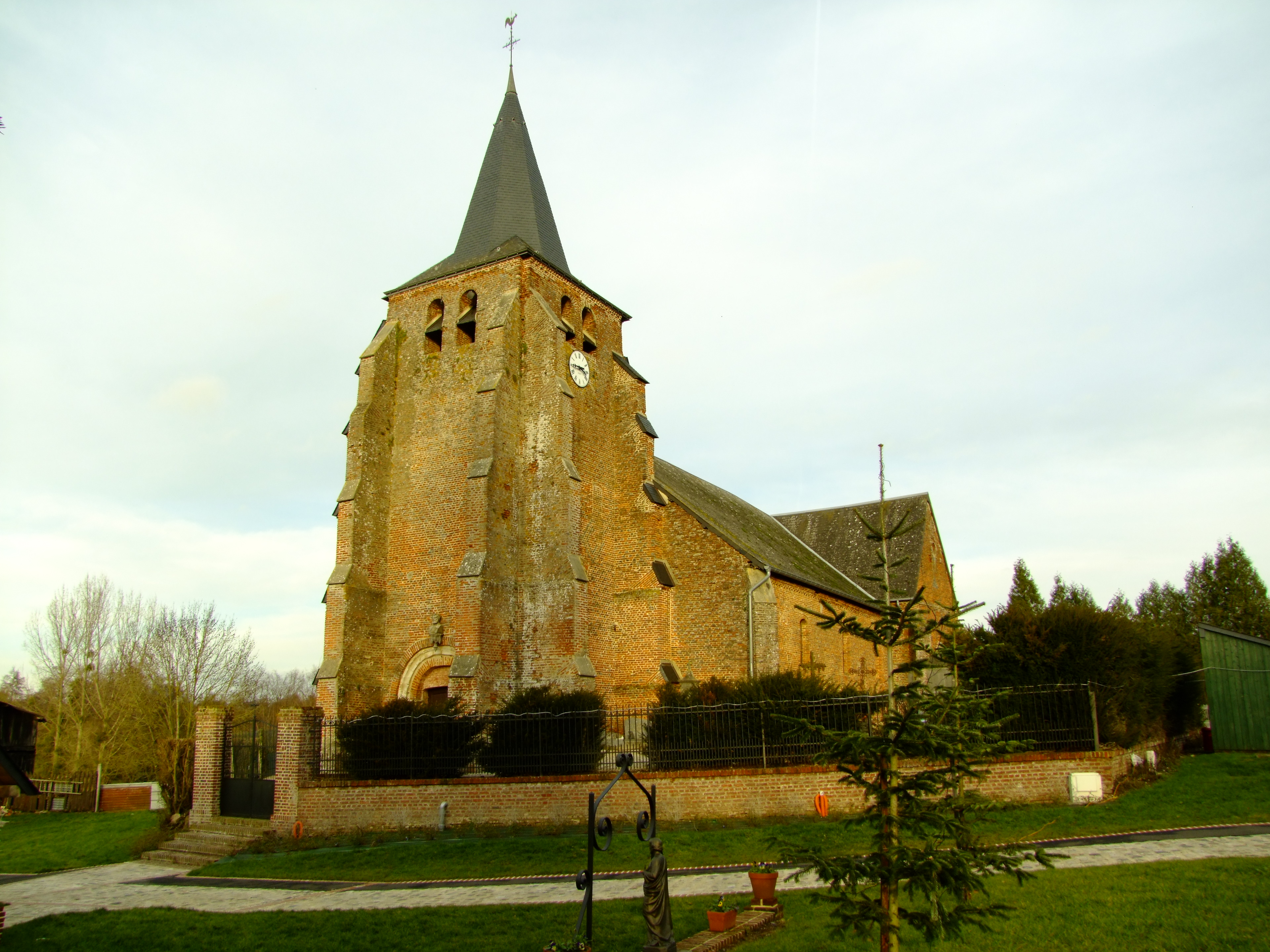
- The church of Saint-Pierre-lès-Franqueville
- Location of Saint-Pierre-lès-Franqueville
- Location within France Location within Hauts-de-France
- Coordinates: 49°49′13″N 3°49′28″E
- Country: France
- Region: Hauts-de-France
- Department: Aisne
- Arrondissement: Vervins
- Canton: Marle
- Intercommunality: Thiérache du Centre

Government
  - Mayor (2026–32): Jean-Luc Lefebvre
- Area^{1}: 7 km^{2} (2.7 sq mi)
- Elevation: 121 m (397 ft)
- Highest elevation: 182 m (597 ft)
- Lowest elevation: 106 m (348 ft)
- Population (2023): 39
  - Density: 5.6/km^{2} (14/sq mi)
- Time zone: UTC+01:00 (CET)
  - Summer (DST): UTC+02:00 (CEST)
- INSEE/Postal code: 02688 /02140
- ^{1} French Land Register data, which excludes lakes, ponds, glaciers > 1 km^{2} (0.386 sq mi or 247 acres) and river estuaries.

Saint-Pierre-lès-Franqueville is a commune in the Aisne department and Hauts-de-France region of northern France.

== Population ==
Historical population
Year	Pop.	±% p.a.
1968	91	—
1975	74	−2.91%
1982	71	−0.59%
1990	52	−3.82%
1999	60	+1.60%
2007	58	−0.42%
2012	68	+3.23%
2017	53	−4.86%
2023	39	−4.98%
Source: INSEE

== See also ==
- Communes of the Aisne department
