= Canton of Laon-Sud =

Coordinates: 49°34′N 3°37′E

Laon-Sud
- Former canton
- Interactive map of Laon-Sud
- Country: France
- Region: Hauts-de-France
- Department: Aisne
- No. of communes: {{{nbcomm}}}
- Disbanded: 2015
- Population (2012): 23,178

The canton of Laon-Sud is a former administrative division in northern France. It was disbanded following the French canton reorganisation which came into effect in March 2015. It had 23,178 inhabitants (2012).

The canton comprised the following communes:

- Arrancy
- Athies-sous-Laon
- Bièvres
- Bruyères-et-Montbérault
- Chérêt
- Chivy-lès-Étouvelles
- Clacy-et-Thierret
- Eppes
- Étouvelles
- Festieux
- Laon (partly)
- Montchâlons
- Nouvion-le-Vineux
- Orgeval
- Parfondru
- Ployart-et-Vaurseine
- Presles-et-Thierny
- Samoussy
- Veslud
- Vorges

== Demographics ==
Historical population
Year	Pop.	±%
1990	23,875	—
1999	23,499	−1.6%
2012	23,178	−1.4%

== See also ==
- Cantons of the Aisne department
