= Canton of Craonne =

Coordinates: 49°26′27″N 3°47′15″E

Craonne
- Former canton
- Interactive map of Craonne
- Country: France
- Region: Hauts-de-France
- Department: Aisne
- No. of communes: {{{nbcomm}}}
- Disbanded: 2015
- Area: 193.46 km^{2} (74.70 sq mi)
- Population (2012): 6,085
  - Density: 31.45/km^{2} (81.46/sq mi)

The canton of Craonne is a former administrative division in northern France. It was disbanded following the French canton reorganisation which came into effect in March 2015. It had 6,085 inhabitants (2012).

The canton comprised the following communes:

- Aizelles
- Aubigny-en-Laonnois
- Beaurieux
- Berrieux
- Bouconville-Vauclair
- Bourg-et-Comin
- Braye-en-Laonnois
- Cerny-en-Laonnois
- Chamouille
- Chermizy-Ailles
- Colligis-Crandelain
- Corbeny
- Craonne
- Craonnelle
- Cuiry-lès-Chaudardes
- Cuissy-et-Geny
- Goudelancourt-lès-Berrieux
- Jumigny
- Lierval
- Martigny-Courpierre
- Monthenault
- Moulins
- Moussy-Verneuil
- Neuville-sur-Ailette
- Œuilly
- Oulches-la-Vallée-Foulon
- Paissy
- Pancy-Courtecon
- Pargnan
- Sainte-Croix
- Saint-Thomas
- Trucy
- Vassogne
- Vendresse-Beaulne

== Demographics ==
Historical population Canton of Craonne
Year	1962	1968	1975	1982	1990	1999
Pop.	4,435	4,870	4,579	4,683	4,773	5,156
±%	—	+9.8%	−6.0%	+2.3%	+1.9%	+8.0%
From the year 1962 on: No double counting – residents of multiple communes (e.g. students and military personnel) are counted only once. Source: INSEE

== See also ==
- Cantons of the Aisne department
