= 02205 =

02205 may refer to:

- Boston, Massachusetts, U.S., particularly the vicinity of South Station
- Colligis-Crandelain, a commune in Aisne département, France
- Rösrath, a town in North Rhine-Westphalia, Germany
