= Communes of the Aisne department =

List of communes of the Aisne department of France

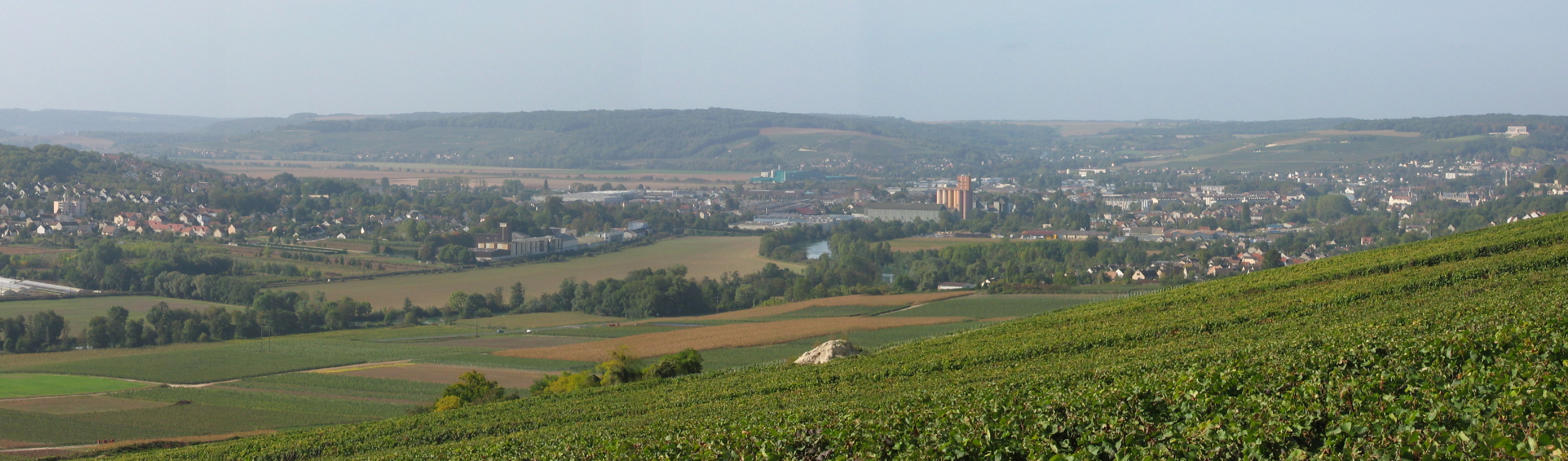
Panorama of the Marne valley with view of the city of Château-Thierry.

The following is a list of the 796 communes in the French department of Aisne.

The communes cooperate in the following intercommunalities (as of 2025):

- Communauté d'agglomération Chauny Tergnier La Fère
- Communauté d'agglomération du Pays de Laon
- Communauté d'agglomération de la Région de Château-Thierry
- Communauté d'agglomération du Saint-Quentinois
- CA GrandSoissons Agglomération
- Communauté de communes du Canton de Charly-sur-Marne
- Communauté de communes du Canton d'Oulchy-le-Château
- Communauté de communes de la Champagne Picarde
- Communauté de communes du Chemin des Dames
- Communauté de communes de l'Est de la Somme (partly)
- Communauté de communes du Pays de la Serre
- Communauté de communes du Pays du Vermandois
- Communauté de communes Picardie des Châteaux
- Communauté de communes des Portes de la Thiérache
- Communauté de communes Retz en Valois
- Communauté de communes de la Thiérache du Centre
- Communauté de communes Thiérache Sambre et Oise
- Communauté de communes des Trois Rivières
- Communauté de communes du Val de l'Aisne
- Communauté de communes du Val de l'Oise

| INSEE | Postal | Commune |
|---|---|---|
| 02001 | 02300 | Abbécourt |
| 02002 | 02800 | Achery |
| 02003 | 02200 | Acy |
| 02004 | 02340 | Agnicourt-et-Séchelles |
| 02005 | 02190 | Aguilcourt |
| 02006 | 02110 | Aisonville-et-Bernoville |
| 02007 | 02820 | Aizelles |
| 02008 | 02370 | Aizy-Jouy |
| 02009 | 02240 | Alaincourt |
| 02010 | 02320 | Allemant |
| 02011 | 02290 | Ambleny |
| 02012 | 02200 | Ambrief |
| 02013 | 02190 | Amifontaine |
| 02014 | 02700 | Amigny-Rouy |
| 02015 | 02600 | Ancienville |
| 02016 | 02800 | Andelain |
| 02017 | 02800 | Anguilcourt-le-Sart |
| 02018 | 02320 | Anizy-le-Grand |
| 02019 | 02480 | Annois |
| 02020 | 02500 | Any-Martin-Rieux |
| 02021 | 02360 | Archon |
| 02022 | 02130 | Arcy-Sainte-Restitue |
| 02023 | 02210 | Armentières-sur-Ourcq |
| 02024 | 02860 | Arrancy |
| 02025 | 02480 | Artemps |
| 02027 | 02270 | Assis-sur-Serre |
| 02028 | 02840 | Athies-sous-Laon |
| 02029 | 02490 | Attilly |
| 02030 | 02420 | Aubencheul-aux-Bois |
| 02031 | 02500 | Aubenton |
| 02032 | 02590 | Aubigny-aux-Kaisnes |
| 02033 | 02820 | Aubigny-en-Laonnois |
| 02034 | 02300 | Audignicourt |
| 02035 | 02120 | Audigny |
| 02036 | 02220 | Augy |
| 02037 | 02000 | Aulnois-sous-Laon |
| 02038 | 02360 | Les Autels |
| 02039 | 02250 | Autremencourt |
| 02040 | 02580 | Autreppes |
| 02041 | 02300 | Autreville |
| 02042 | 02400 | Azy-sur-Marne |
| 02043 | 02290 | Bagneux |
| 02044 | 02140 | Bancigny |
| 02046 | 02000 | Barenton-Bugny |
| 02047 | 02000 | Barenton-Cel |
| 02048 | 02270 | Barenton-sur-Serre |
| 02049 | 02700 | Barisis-aux-Bois |
| 02050 | 02170 | Barzy-en-Thiérache |
| 02051 | 02850 | Barzy-sur-Marne |
| 02052 | 02380 | Bassoles-Aulers |
| 02054 | 02220 | Bazoches-et-Saint-Thibaut |
| 02055 | 02500 | Beaumé |
| 02056 | 02300 | Beaumont-en-Beine |
| 02057 | 02110 | Beaurevoir |
| 02058 | 02160 | Beaurieux |
| 02059 | 02800 | Beautor |
| 02060 | 02590 | Beauvois-en-Vermandois |
| 02061 | 02110 | Becquigny |
| 02062 | 02400 | Belleau |
| 02063 | 02420 | Bellenglise |
| 02064 | 02200 | Belleu |
| 02065 | 02420 | Bellicourt |
| 02066 | 02440 | Benay |
| 02067 | 02450 | Bergues-sur-Sambre |
| 02068 | 02250 | Berlancourt |
| 02069 | 02340 | Berlise |
| 02070 | 02120 | Bernot |
| 02564 | 02200 | Bernoy-le-Château |
| 02071 | 02290 | Berny-Rivière |
| 02072 | 02820 | Berrieux |
| 02073 | 02190 | Berry-au-Bac |
| 02074 | 02800 | Bertaucourt-Epourdon |
| 02075 | 02240 | Berthenicourt |
| 02076 | 02190 | Bertricourt |
| 02078 | 02300 | Besmé |
| 02079 | 02500 | Besmont |
| 02080 | 02870 | Besny-et-Loizy |
| 02081 | 02300 | Béthancourt-en-Vaux |
| 02082 | 02210 | Beugneux |
| 02083 | 02130 | Beuvardes |
| 02084 | 02310 | Bézu-le-Guéry |
| 02085 | 02400 | Bézu-Saint-Germain |
| 02086 | 02300 | Bichancourt |
| 02087 | 02290 | Bieuxy |
| 02088 | 02860 | Bièvres |
| 02089 | 02200 | Billy-sur-Aisne |
| 02090 | 02210 | Billy-sur-Ourcq |
| 02091 | 02160 | Blanzy-lès-Fismes |
| 02093 | 02300 | Blérancourt |
| 02094 | 02400 | Blesmes |
| 02095 | 02110 | Bohain-en-Vermandois |
| 02096 | 02270 | Bois-lès-Pargny |
| 02097 | 02350 | Boncourt |
| 02098 | 02400 | Bonneil |
| 02099 | 02400 | Bonnesvalyn |
| 02100 | 02420 | Bony |
| 02101 | 02250 | Bosmont-sur-Serre |
| 02102 | 02860 | Bouconville-Vauclair |
| 02103 | 02450 | Boué |
| 02104 | 02160 | Bouffignereux |
| 02105 | 02400 | Bouresches |
| 02106 | 02160 | Bourg-et-Comin |
| 02107 | 02300 | Bourguignon-sous-Coucy |
| 02108 | 02000 | Bourguignon-sous-Montbavin |
| 02109 | 02140 | La Bouteille |
| 02110 | 02220 | Braine |
| 02111 | 02320 | Brancourt-en-Laonnois |
| 02112 | 02110 | Brancourt-le-Grand |
| 02114 | 02400 | Brasles |
| 02118 | 02880 | Braye |
| 02115 | 02000 | Braye-en-Laonnois |
| 02116 | 02140 | Braye-en-Thiérache |
| 02117 | 02480 | Bray-Saint-Christophe |
| 02119 | 02210 | Brécy |
| 02120 | 02220 | Brenelle |
| 02121 | 02210 | Breny |
| 02122 | 02870 | Brie |
| 02123 | 02240 | Brissay-Choigny |
| 02124 | 02240 | Brissy-Hamégicourt |
| 02125 | 02810 | Brumetz |
| 02126 | 02360 | Brunehamel |
| 02128 | 02860 | Bruyères-et-Montbérault |
| 02127 | 02130 | Bruyères-sur-Fère |
| 02129 | 02220 | Bruys |
| 02130 | 02500 | Bucilly |
| 02131 | 02880 | Bucy-le-Long |
| 02132 | 02870 | Bucy-lès-Cerny |
| 02133 | 02350 | Bucy-lès-Pierrepont |
| 02134 | 02500 | Buire |
| 02135 | 02620 | Buironfosse |
| 02136 | 02140 | Burelles |
| 02137 | 02810 | Bussiares |
| 02138 | 02200 | Buzancy |
| 02139 | 02300 | Caillouël-Crépigny |
| 02140 | 02300 | Camelin |
| 02141 | 02260 | La Capelle |
| 02142 | 02680 | Castres |
| 02143 | 02420 | Le Catelet |
| 02144 | 02490 | Caulaincourt |
| 02145 | 02300 | Caumont |
| 02146 | 02330 | Celles-lès-Condé |
| 02148 | 02370 | Celles-sur-Aisne |
| 02149 | 02240 | Cerizy |
| 02150 | 02860 | Cerny-en-Laonnois |
| 02151 | 02870 | Cerny-lès-Bucy |
| 02152 | 02220 | Cerseuil |
| 02153 | 02320 | Cessières-Suzy |
| 02154 | 02200 | Chacrise |
| 02155 | 02000 | Chaillevois |
| 02156 | 02270 | Chalandry |
| 02157 | 02000 | Chambry |
| 02158 | 02860 | Chamouille |
| 02159 | 02670 | Champs |
| 02160 | 02340 | Chaourse |
| 02162 | 02570 | La Chapelle-sur-Chézy |
| 02163 | 02310 | Charly-sur-Marne |
| 02164 | 02850 | Le Charmel |
| 02165 | 02800 | Charmes |
| 02166 | 02400 | Chartèves |
| 02167 | 02370 | Chassemy |
| 02168 | 02400 | Château-Thierry |
| 02169 | 02270 | Châtillon-lès-Sons |
| 02170 | 02240 | Châtillon-sur-Oise |
| 02171 | 02160 | Chaudardes |
| 02172 | 02200 | Chaudun |
| 02173 | 02300 | Chauny |
| 02174 | 02000 | Chavignon |
| 02175 | 02880 | Chavigny |
| 02176 | 02370 | Chavonne |
| 02177 | 02860 | Chérêt |
| 02178 | 02860 | Chermizy-Ailles |
| 02179 | 02220 | Chéry-Chartreuve |
| 02180 | 02000 | Chéry-lès-Pouilly |
| 02181 | 02360 | Chéry-lès-Rozoy |
| 02182 | 02250 | Chevennes |
| 02183 | 02000 | Chevregny |
| 02184 | 02270 | Chevresis-Monceau |
| 02185 | 02810 | Chézy-en-Orxois |
| 02186 | 02570 | Chézy-sur-Marne |
| 02187 | 02400 | Chierry |
| 02188 | 02120 | Chigny |
| 02189 | 02350 | Chivres-en-Laonnois |
| 02190 | 02880 | Chivres-Val |
| 02191 | 02000 | Chivy-lès-Étouvelles |
| 02192 | 02210 | Chouy |
| 02193 | 02130 | Cierges |
| 02194 | 02250 | Cilly |
| 02195 | 02220 | Ciry-Salsogne |
| 02196 | 02000 | Clacy-et-Thierret |
| 02197 | 02260 | Clairfontaine |
| 02198 | 02880 | Clamecy |
| 02199 | 02440 | Clastres |
| 02200 | 02340 | Clermont-les-Fermes |
| 02201 | 02600 | Cœuvres-et-Valsery |
| 02203 | 02210 | Coincy |
| 02204 | 02360 | Coingt |
| 02205 | 02860 | Colligis-Crandelain |
| 02206 | 02120 | Colonfay |
| 02207 | 02300 | Commenchon |
| 02208 | 02160 | Concevreux |
| 02209 | 02330 | Condé-en-Brie |
| 02210 | 02370 | Condé-sur-Aisne |
| 02211 | 02190 | Condé-sur-Suippe |
| 02212 | 02700 | Condren |
| 02213 | 02330 | Connigis |
| 02214 | 02680 | Contescourt |
| 02215 | 02820 | Corbeny |
| 02216 | 02600 | Corcy |
| 02219 | 02380 | Coucy-la-Ville |
| 02217 | 02380 | Coucy-le-Château-Auffrique |
| 02218 | 02840 | Coucy-lès-Eppes |
| 02220 | 02130 | Coulonges-Cohan |
| 02221 | 02310 | Coupru |
| 02222 | 02800 | Courbes |
| 02223 | 02330 | Courboin |
| 02224 | 02220 | Courcelles-sur-Vesle |
| 02225 | 02810 | Courchamps |
| 02226 | 02200 | Courmelles |
| 02227 | 02130 | Courmont |
| 02228 | 02850 | Courtemont-Varennes |
| 02229 | 02820 | Courtrizy-et-Fussigny |
| 02230 | 02220 | Couvrelles |
| 02231 | 02270 | Couvron-et-Aumencourt |
| 02232 | 02600 | Coyolles |
| 02233 | 02130 | Cramaille |
| 02234 | 02160 | Craonne |
| 02235 | 02160 | Craonnelle |
| 02236 | 02380 | Crécy-au-Mont |
| 02237 | 02270 | Crécy-sur-Serre |
| 02238 | 02870 | Crépy |
| 02239 | 02650 | Crézancy |
| 02240 | 02110 | Croix-Fonsomme |
| 02241 | 02210 | La Croix-sur-Ourcq |
| 02242 | 02310 | Crouttes-sur-Marne |
| 02243 | 02880 | Crouy |
| 02244 | 02120 | Crupilly |
| 02245 | 02880 | Cuffies |
| 02246 | 02480 | Cugny |
| 02248 | 02350 | Cuirieux |
| 02249 | 02220 | Cuiry-Housse |
| 02250 | 02160 | Cuiry-lès-Chaudardes |
| 02251 | 02360 | Cuiry-lès-Iviers |
| 02252 | 02160 | Cuissy-et-Geny |
| 02253 | 02200 | Cuisy-en-Almont |
| 02254 | 02600 | Cutry |
| 02255 | 02220 | Cys-la-Commune |
| 02256 | 02140 | Dagny-Lambercy |
| 02257 | 02680 | Dallon |
| 02258 | 02470 | Dammard |
| 02259 | 02600 | Dampleux |
| 02260 | 02800 | Danizy |
| 02261 | 02270 | Dercy |
| 02262 | 02700 | Deuillet |
| 02263 | 02220 | Dhuizel |
| 02458 | 02540 | Dhuys-et-Morin-en-Brie |
| 02264 | 02340 | Dizy-le-Gros |
| 02265 | 02360 | Dohis |
| 02266 | 02360 | Dolignon |
| 02267 | 02600 | Dommiers |
| 02268 | 02310 | Domptin |
| 02269 | 02450 | Dorengt |
| 02270 | 02590 | Douchy |
| 02271 | 02130 | Dravegny |
| 02272 | 02210 | Droizy |
| 02273 | 02480 | Dury |
| 02274 | 02350 | Ébouleau |
| 02275 | 02500 | Effry |
| 02276 | 02260 | Englancourt |
| 02277 | 02290 | Épagny |
| 02278 | 02500 | Éparcy |
| 02279 | 02400 | Épaux-Bézu |
| 02280 | 02400 | Épieds |
| 02281 | 02540 | L'Épine-aux-Bois |
| 02282 | 02840 | Eppes |
| 02283 | 02250 | Erlon |
| 02284 | 02260 | Erloy |
| 02286 | 02170 | Esquéhéries |
| 02287 | 02690 | Essigny-le-Grand |
| 02288 | 02100 | Essigny-le-Petit |
| 02289 | 02570 | Essises |
| 02290 | 02400 | Essômes-sur-Marne |
| 02291 | 02420 | Estrées |
| 02292 | 02400 | Étampes-sur-Marne |
| 02293 | 02110 | Étaves-et-Bocquiaux |
| 02294 | 02000 | Étouvelles |
| 02295 | 02580 | Étréaupont |
| 02296 | 02590 | Étreillers |
| 02297 | 02400 | Étrépilly |
| 02298 | 02510 | Étreux |
| 02299 | 02190 | Évergnicourt |
| 02302 | 02600 | Faverolles |
| 02303 | 02100 | Fayet |
| 02304 | 02800 | La Fère |
| 02305 | 02130 | Fère-en-Tardenois |
| 02306 | 02270 | La Ferté-Chevresis |
| 02307 | 02460 | La Ferté-Milon |
| 02308 | 02450 | Fesmy-le-Sart |
| 02309 | 02840 | Festieux |
| 02310 | 02110 | Fieulaine |
| 02312 | 02260 | La Flamengrie |
| 02313 | 02120 | Flavigny-le-Grand-et-Beaurain |
| 02315 | 02520 | Flavy-le-Martel |
| 02316 | 02600 | Fleury |
| 02317 | 02590 | Fluquières |
| 02318 | 02670 | Folembray |
| 02319 | 02110 | Fonsomme |
| 02320 | 02680 | Fontaine-lès-Clercs |
| 02321 | 02140 | Fontaine-lès-Vervins |
| 02322 | 02110 | Fontaine-Notre-Dame |
| 02323 | 02110 | Fontaine-Uterte |
| 02324 | 02170 | Fontenelle |
| 02326 | 02290 | Fontenoy |
| 02327 | 02590 | Foreste |
| 02328 | 02650 | Fossoy |
| 02329 | 02870 | Fourdrain |
| 02330 | 02760 | Francilly-Selency |
| 02331 | 02140 | Franqueville |
| 02332 | 02130 | Fresnes-en-Tardenois |
| 02333 | 02380 | Fresnes-sous-Coucy |
| 02334 | 02230 | Fresnoy-le-Grand |
| 02335 | 02800 | Fressancourt |
| 02336 | 02700 | Frières-Faillouël |
| 02337 | 02260 | Froidestrées |
| 02338 | 02270 | Froidmont-Cohartille |
| 02339 | 02810 | Gandelu |
| 02340 | 02430 | Gauchy |
| 02341 | 02140 | Gercy |
| 02342 | 02260 | Gergny |
| 02343 | 02590 | Germaine |
| 02345 | 02440 | Gibercourt |
| 02346 | 02350 | Gizy |
| 02347 | 02400 | Gland |
| 02349 | 02820 | Goudelancourt-lès-Berrieux |
| 02350 | 02350 | Goudelancourt-lès-Pierrepont |
| 02351 | 02130 | Goussancourt |
| 02352 | 02420 | Gouy |
| 02353 | 02350 | Grandlup-et-Fay |
| 02354 | 02360 | Grandrieux |
| 02665 | 02210 | Grand-Rozoy |
| 02783 | 02120 | Grand-Verly |
| 02355 | 02100 | Gricourt |
| 02356 | 02210 | Grisolles |
| 02357 | 02140 | Gronard |
| 02358 | 02110 | Grougis |
| 02359 | 02680 | Grugies |
| 02361 | 02120 | Guise |
| 02362 | 02300 | Guivry |
| 02363 | 02300 | Guny |
| 02364 | 02160 | Guyencourt |
| 02366 | 02510 | Hannapes |
| 02367 | 02480 | Happencourt |
| 02368 | 02600 | Haramont |
| 02369 | 02140 | Harcigny |
| 02370 | 02420 | Hargicourt |
| 02371 | 02100 | Harly |
| 02372 | 02210 | Hartennes-et-Taux |
| 02373 | 02140 | Hary |
| 02375 | 02810 | Hautevesnes |
| 02376 | 02120 | Hauteville |
| 02377 | 02140 | Haution |
| 02378 | 02500 | La Hérie |
| 02379 | 02120 | Le Hérie-la-Viéville |
| 02380 | 02440 | Hinacourt |
| 02381 | 02500 | Hirson |
| 02382 | 02760 | Holnon |
| 02383 | 02720 | Homblières |
| 02384 | 02140 | Houry |
| 02385 | 02250 | Housset |
| 02386 | 02510 | Iron |
| 02387 | 02240 | Itancourt |
| 02388 | 02360 | Iviers |
| 02389 | 02850 | Jaulgonne |
| 02390 | 02490 | Jeancourt |
| 02391 | 02140 | Jeantes |
| 02392 | 02420 | Joncourt |
| 02393 | 02220 | Jouaignes |
| 02395 | 02380 | Jumencourt |
| 02396 | 02160 | Jumigny |
| 02397 | 02480 | Jussy |
| 02398 | 02880 | Juvigny |
| 02399 | 02190 | Juvincourt-et-Damary |
| 02400 | 02880 | Laffaux |
| 02401 | 02140 | Laigny |
| 02402 | 02590 | Lanchy |
| 02403 | 02120 | Landifay-et-Bertaignemont |
| 02404 | 02140 | Landouzy-la-Cour |
| 02405 | 02140 | Landouzy-la-Ville |
| 02406 | 02380 | Landricourt |
| 02407 | 02000 | Laniscourt |
| 02408 | 02000 | Laon |
| 02409 | 02150 | Lappion |
| 02410 | 02600 | Largny-sur-Automne |
| 02411 | 02210 | Latilly |
| 02412 | 02210 | Launoy |
| 02413 | 02860 | Laval-en-Laonnois |
| 02414 | 02450 | Lavaqueresse |
| 02415 | 02600 | Laversine |
| 02374 | 02420 | Lehaucourt |
| 02416 | 02140 | Lemé |

| INSEE | Postal | Commune |
|---|---|---|
| 02417 | 02420 | Lempire |
| 02418 | 02260 | Lerzy |
| 02419 | 02170 | Leschelle |
| 02420 | 02100 | Lesdins |
| 02421 | 02220 | Lesges |
| 02422 | 02120 | Lesquielles-Saint-Germain |
| 02423 | 02380 | Leuilly-sous-Coucy |
| 02424 | 02880 | Leury |
| 02425 | 02500 | Leuze |
| 02426 | 02420 | Levergies |
| 02427 | 02220 | Lhuys |
| 02428 | 02810 | Licy-Clignon |
| 02429 | 02860 | Lierval |
| 02430 | 02350 | Liesse-Notre-Dame |
| 02431 | 02700 | Liez |
| 02432 | 02220 | Limé |
| 02433 | 02340 | Lislet |
| 02435 | 02500 | Logny-lès-Aubenton |
| 02438 | 02600 | Longpont |
| 02440 | 02190 | Lor |
| 02441 | 02600 | Louâtre |
| 02442 | 02130 | Loupeigne |
| 02443 | 02400 | Lucy-le-Bocage |
| 02444 | 02140 | Lugny |
| 02445 | 02500 | Luzoir |
| 02446 | 02440 | Ly-Fontaine |
| 02447 | 02220 | Maast-et-Violaine |
| 02448 | 02350 | Mâchecourt |
| 02449 | 02470 | Macogny |
| 02450 | 02120 | Macquigny |
| 02451 | 02420 | Magny-la-Fosse |
| 02452 | 02490 | Maissemy |
| 02453 | 02160 | Maizy |
| 02454 | 02190 | La Malmaison |
| 02455 | 02120 | Malzy |
| 02456 | 02300 | Manicamp |
| 02457 | 02350 | Marchais |
| 02459 | 02720 | Marcy |
| 02460 | 02250 | Marcy-sous-Marle |
| 02461 | 02300 | Marest-Dampcourt |
| 02462 | 02130 | Mareuil-en-Dôle |
| 02463 | 02140 | Marfontaine |
| 02464 | 02880 | Margival |
| 02465 | 02810 | Marigny-en-Orxois |
| 02466 | 02470 | Marizy-Sainte-Geneviève |
| 02467 | 02470 | Marizy-Saint-Mard |
| 02468 | 02250 | Marle |
| 02469 | 02120 | Marly-Gomont |
| 02470 | 02500 | Martigny |
| 02471 | 02860 | Martigny-Courpierre |
| 02472 | 02820 | Mauregny-en-Haye |
| 02473 | 02800 | Mayot |
| 02474 | 02700 | Mennessis |
| 02476 | 02630 | Mennevret |
| 02477 | 02200 | Mercin-et-Vaux |
| 02478 | 02000 | Merlieux-et-Fouquerolles |
| 02480 | 02270 | Mesbrecourt-Richecourt |
| 02481 | 02720 | Mesnil-Saint-Laurent |
| 02482 | 02160 | Meurival |
| 02483 | 02240 | Mézières-sur-Oise |
| 02484 | 02650 | Mézy-Moulins |
| 02485 | 02200 | Missy-aux-Bois |
| 02486 | 02350 | Missy-lès-Pierrepont |
| 02487 | 02880 | Missy-sur-Aisne |
| 02488 | 02110 | Molain |
| 02489 | 02000 | Molinchart |
| 02490 | 02000 | Monampteuil |
| 02491 | 02270 | Monceau-le-Neuf-et-Faucouzy |
| 02492 | 02270 | Monceau-lès-Leups |
| 02493 | 02840 | Monceau-le-Waast |
| 02494 | 02120 | Monceau-sur-Oise |
| 02495 | 02500 | Mondrepuis |
| 02496 | 02470 | Monnes |
| 02497 | 02000 | Mons-en-Laonnois |
| 02498 | 02820 | Montaigu |
| 02499 | 02000 | Montbavin |
| 02500 | 02110 | Montbrehain |
| 02501 | 02860 | Montchâlons |
| 02502 | 02340 | Montcornet |
| 02503 | 02390 | Mont-d'Origny |
| 02504 | 02440 | Montescourt-Lizerolles |
| 02505 | 02540 | Montfaucon |
| 02506 | 02600 | Montgobert |
| 02507 | 02210 | Montgru-Saint-Hilaire |
| 02508 | 02860 | Monthenault |
| 02509 | 02400 | Monthiers |
| 02510 | 02330 | Monthurel |
| 02511 | 02110 | Montigny-en-Arrouaise |
| 02512 | 02810 | Montigny-l'Allier |
| 02513 | 02250 | Montigny-le-Franc |
| 02514 | 02290 | Montigny-Lengrain |
| 02515 | 02330 | Montigny-lès-Condé |
| 02516 | 02250 | Montigny-sous-Marle |
| 02517 | 02270 | Montigny-sur-Crécy |
| 02518 | 02330 | Montlevon |
| 02519 | 02340 | Montloué |
| 02520 | 02220 | Mont-Notre-Dame |
| 02521 | 02310 | Montreuil-aux-Lions |
| 02522 | 02360 | Mont-Saint-Jean |
| 02523 | 02220 | Mont-Saint-Martin |
| 02524 | 02400 | Mont-Saint-Père |
| 02525 | 02100 | Morcourt |
| 02526 | 02360 | Morgny-en-Thiérache |
| 02527 | 02290 | Morsain |
| 02528 | 02600 | Mortefontaine |
| 02529 | 02270 | Mortiers |
| 02530 | 02160 | Moulins |
| 02531 | 02160 | Moussy-Verneuil |
| 02532 | 02610 | Moÿ-de-l'Aisne |
| 02533 | 02210 | Muret-et-Crouttes |
| 02534 | 02160 | Muscourt |
| 02535 | 02140 | Nampcelles-la-Cour |
| 02536 | 02200 | Nampteuil-sous-Muret |
| 02537 | 02880 | Nanteuil-la-Fosse |
| 02538 | 02210 | Nanteuil-Notre-Dame |
| 02539 | 02420 | Nauroy |
| 02540 | 02400 | Nesles-la-Montagne |
| 02541 | 02190 | Neufchâtel-sur-Aisne |
| 02542 | 02300 | Neuflieux |
| 02543 | 02470 | Neuilly-Saint-Front |
| 02544 | 02500 | Neuve-Maison |
| 02545 | 02250 | La Neuville-Bosmont |
| 02546 | 02300 | La Neuville-en-Beine |
| 02547 | 02250 | La Neuville-Housset |
| 02548 | 02450 | La Neuville-lès-Dorengt |
| 02549 | 02100 | Neuville-Saint-Amand |
| 02550 | 02860 | Neuville-sur-Ailette |
| 02551 | 02880 | Neuville-sur-Margival |
| 02552 | 02390 | Neuvillette |
| 02553 | 02150 | Nizy-le-Comte |
| 02554 | 02400 | Nogentel |
| 02555 | 02310 | Nogent-l'Artaud |
| 02556 | 02340 | Noircourt |
| 02557 | 02600 | Noroy-sur-Ourcq |
| 02558 | 02170 | Le Nouvion-en-Thiérache |
| 02559 | 02270 | Nouvion-et-Catillon |
| 02560 | 02800 | Nouvion-le-Comte |
| 02561 | 02860 | Nouvion-le-Vineux |
| 02562 | 02290 | Nouvron-Vingré |
| 02563 | 02120 | Noyales |
| 02565 | 02160 | Œuilly |
| 02566 | 02300 | Ognes |
| 02567 | 02500 | Ohis |
| 02568 | 02600 | Oigny-en-Valois |
| 02569 | 02450 | Oisy |
| 02570 | 02480 | Ollezy |
| 02571 | 02100 | Omissy |
| 02572 | 02190 | Orainville |
| 02573 | 02860 | Orgeval |
| 02574 | 02550 | Origny-en-Thiérache |
| 02575 | 02390 | Origny-Sainte-Benoite |
| 02576 | 02290 | Osly-Courtil |
| 02577 | 02370 | Ostel |
| 02578 | 02160 | Oulches-la-Vallée-Foulon |
| 02579 | 02210 | Oulchy-la-Ville |
| 02580 | 02210 | Oulchy-le-Château |
| 02581 | 02220 | Paars |
| 02582 | 02160 | Paissy |
| 02583 | 02860 | Pancy-Courtecon |
| 02584 | 02260 | Papleux |
| 02585 | 02210 | Parcy-et-Tigny |
| 02586 | 02360 | Parfondeval |
| 02587 | 02840 | Parfondru |
| 02588 | 02160 | Pargnan |
| 02589 | 02000 | Pargny-et-Filain |
| 02590 | 02330 | Pargny-la-Dhuys |
| 02591 | 02270 | Pargny-les-Bois |
| 02592 | 02240 | Parpeville |
| 02593 | 02200 | Pasly |
| 02594 | 02470 | Passy-en-Valois |
| 02595 | 02850 | Passy-sur-Marne |
| 02596 | 02310 | Pavant |
| 02598 | 02200 | Pernant |
| 02784 | 02630 | Petit-Verly |
| 02599 | 02300 | Pierremande |
| 02600 | 02350 | Pierrepont |
| 02601 | 02190 | Pignicourt |
| 02602 | 02320 | Pinon |
| 02604 | 02480 | Pithon |
| 02605 | 02240 | Pleine-Selve |
| 02606 | 02210 | Le Plessier-Huleu |
| 02607 | 02200 | Ploisy |
| 02608 | 02140 | Plomion |
| 02609 | 02860 | Ployart-et-Vaurseine |
| 02610 | 02200 | Pommiers |
| 02612 | 02160 | Pont-Arcy |
| 02613 | 02160 | Pontavert |
| 02614 | 02490 | Pontru |
| 02615 | 02490 | Pontruet |
| 02616 | 02380 | Pont-Saint-Mard |
| 02617 | 02270 | Pouilly-sur-Serre |
| 02618 | 02110 | Prémont |
| 02619 | 02320 | Prémontré |
| 02620 | 02370 | Presles-et-Boves |
| 02621 | 02860 | Presles-et-Thierny |
| 02622 | 02470 | Priez |
| 02623 | 02140 | Prisces |
| 02624 | 02120 | Proisy |
| 02625 | 02120 | Proix |
| 02626 | 02190 | Prouvais |
| 02627 | 02190 | Proviseux-et-Plesnoy |
| 02628 | 02600 | Puiseux-en-Retz |
| 02629 | 02120 | Puisieux-et-Clanlieu |
| 02631 | 02300 | Quierzy |
| 02632 | 02380 | Quincy-Basse |
| 02633 | 02220 | Quincy-sous-le-Mont |
| 02634 | 02360 | Raillimont |
| 02635 | 02110 | Ramicourt |
| 02636 | 02240 | Regny |
| 02637 | 02100 | Remaucourt |
| 02638 | 02270 | Remies |
| 02639 | 02440 | Remigny |
| 02640 | 02240 | Renansart |
| 02641 | 02340 | Renneval |
| 02642 | 02360 | Résigny |
| 02643 | 02290 | Ressons-le-Long |
| 02644 | 02600 | Retheuil |
| 02645 | 02850 | Reuilly-Sauvigny |
| 02647 | 02110 | Ribeauville |
| 02648 | 02240 | Ribemont |
| 02649 | 02210 | Rocourt-Saint-Martin |
| 02650 | 02260 | Rocquigny |
| 02651 | 02800 | Rogécourt |
| 02652 | 02140 | Rogny |
| 02653 | 02310 | Romeny-sur-Marne |
| 02654 | 02120 | Romery |
| 02655 | 02130 | Ronchères |
| 02656 | 02160 | Roucy |
| 02657 | 02140 | Rougeries |
| 02658 | 02590 | Roupy |
| 02659 | 02100 | Rouvroy |
| 02660 | 02360 | Rouvroy-sur-Serre |
| 02661 | 02000 | Royaucourt-et-Chailvet |
| 02662 | 02210 | Rozet-Saint-Albin |
| 02663 | 02200 | Rozières-sur-Crise |
| 02664 | 02540 | Rozoy-Bellevalle |
| 02666 | 02360 | Rozoy-sur-Serre |
| 02667 | 02200 | Saconin-et-Breuil |
| 02668 | 02120 | Sains-Richaumont |
| 02670 | 02260 | Saint-Algis |
| 02671 | 02300 | Saint-Aubin |
| 02672 | 02290 | Saint-Bandry |
| 02673 | 02290 | Saint-Christophe-à-Berry |
| 02674 | 02360 | Saint-Clément |
| 02675 | 02820 | Sainte-Croix |
| 02678 | 02340 | Sainte-Geneviève |
| 02690 | 02350 | Sainte-Preuve |
| 02676 | 02820 | Saint-Erme-Outre-et-Ramecourt |
| 02677 | 02330 | Saint-Eugène |
| 02679 | 02810 | Saint-Gengoulph |
| 02680 | 02410 | Saint-Gobain |
| 02681 | 02140 | Saint-Gobert |
| 02682 | 02220 | Saint-Mard |
| 02683 | 02110 | Saint-Martin-Rivière |
| 02684 | 02830 | Saint-Michel |
| 02685 | 02410 | Saint-Nicolas-aux-Bois |
| 02686 | 02300 | Saint-Paul-aux-Bois |
| 02687 | 02600 | Saint-Pierre-Aigle |
| 02688 | 02140 | Saint-Pierre-lès-Franqueville |
| 02689 | 02250 | Saint-Pierremont |
| 02691 | 02100 | Saint-Quentin |
| 02693 | 02210 | Saint-Rémy-Blanzy |
| 02694 | 02640 | Saint-Simon |
| 02696 | 02820 | Saint-Thomas |
| 02697 | 02840 | Samoussy |
| 02698 | 02880 | Sancy-les-Cheminots |
| 02699 | 02130 | Saponay |
| 02701 | 02310 | Saulchery |
| 02702 | 02590 | Savy |
| 02703 | 02110 | Seboncourt |
| 02704 | 02300 | Selens |
| 02705 | 02150 | La Selve |
| 02706 | 02200 | Septmonts |
| 02439 | 02160 | Les Septvallons |
| 02707 | 02410 | Septvaux |
| 02708 | 02420 | Sequehart |
| 02709 | 02110 | Serain |
| 02710 | 02790 | Seraucourt-le-Grand |
| 02711 | 02220 | Serches |
| 02712 | 02130 | Sergy |
| 02713 | 02130 | Seringes-et-Nesles |
| 02714 | 02220 | Sermoise |
| 02716 | 02700 | Servais |
| 02715 | 02160 | Serval |
| 02717 | 02240 | Séry-lès-Mézières |
| 02718 | 02460 | Silly-la-Poterie |
| 02719 | 02300 | Sinceny |
| 02720 | 02150 | Sissonne |
| 02721 | 02240 | Sissy |
| 02722 | 02200 | Soissons |
| 02723 | 02340 | Soize |
| 02724 | 02470 | Sommelans |
| 02725 | 02260 | Sommeron |
| 02726 | 02480 | Sommette-Eaucourt |
| 02727 | 02270 | Sons-et-Ronchères |
| 02728 | 02580 | Sorbais |
| 02729 | 02600 | Soucy |
| 02730 | 02160 | Soupir |
| 02731 | 02140 | Le Sourd |
| 02732 | 02240 | Surfontaine |
| 02734 | 02600 | Taillefontaine |
| 02735 | 02220 | Tannières |
| 02736 | 02290 | Tartiers |
| 02737 | 02250 | Tavaux-et-Pontséricourt |
| 02738 | 02700 | Tergnier |
| 02739 | 02880 | Terny-Sorny |
| 02740 | 02140 | Thenailles |
| 02741 | 02390 | Thenelles |
| 02742 | 02250 | Thiernu |
| 02743 | 02340 | Le Thuel |
| 02744 | 02810 | Torcy-en-Valois |
| 02745 | 02250 | Toulis-et-Attencourt |
| 02746 | 02800 | Travecy |
| 02747 | 02490 | Trefcon |
| 02748 | 02850 | Trélou-sur-Marne |
| 02749 | 02460 | Troësnes |
| 02750 | 02300 | Trosly-Loire |
| 02751 | 02860 | Trucy |
| 02752 | 02640 | Tugny-et-Pont |
| 02753 | 02120 | Tupigny |
| 02754 | 02300 | Ugny-le-Gay |
| 02755 | 02000 | Urcel |
| 02756 | 02690 | Urvillers |
| 02757 | 02120 | Vadencourt |
| 02758 | 02370 | Vailly-sur-Aisne |
| 02759 | 02140 | La Vallée-au-Blé |
| 02760 | 02110 | La Vallée-Mulâtre |
| 02053 | 02330 | Vallées-en-Champagne |
| 02761 | 02190 | Variscourt |
| 02762 | 02290 | Vassens |
| 02763 | 02220 | Vasseny |
| 02764 | 02160 | Vassogne |
| 02765 | 02000 | Vaucelles-et-Beffecourt |
| 02766 | 02320 | Vaudesson |
| 02768 | 02320 | Vauxaillon |
| 02769 | 02110 | Vaux-Andigny |
| 02770 | 02200 | Vauxbuin |
| 02772 | 02590 | Vaux-en-Vermandois |
| 02767 | 02200 | Vauxrezis |
| 02773 | 02220 | Vauxtin |
| 02774 | 02490 | Vendelles |
| 02775 | 02800 | Vendeuil |
| 02776 | 02420 | Vendhuile |
| 02777 | 02540 | Vendières |
| 02778 | 02160 | Vendresse-Beaulne |
| 02779 | 02510 | Vénérolles |
| 02780 | 02200 | Venizel |
| 02781 | 02400 | Verdilly |
| 02782 | 02490 | Le Verguier |
| 02785 | 02490 | Vermand |
| 02786 | 02380 | Verneuil-sous-Coucy |
| 02787 | 02000 | Verneuil-sur-Serre |
| 02788 | 02800 | Versigny |
| 02789 | 02140 | Vervins |
| 02790 | 02350 | Vesles-et-Caumont |
| 02791 | 02840 | Veslud |
| 02792 | 02810 | Veuilly-la-Poterie |
| 02793 | 02290 | Vézaponin |
| 02794 | 02130 | Vézilly |
| 02796 | 02210 | Vichel-Nanteuil |
| 02795 | 02290 | Vic-sur-Aisne |
| 02797 | 02160 | Viel-Arcy |
| 02798 | 02540 | Viels-Maisons |
| 02799 | 02210 | Vierzy |
| 02800 | 02540 | Viffort |
| 02801 | 02340 | Vigneux-Hocquet |
| 02802 | 02340 | La Ville-aux-Bois-lès-Dizy |
| 02803 | 02160 | La Ville-aux-Bois-lès-Pontavert |
| 02804 | 02210 | Villemontoire |
| 02805 | 02200 | Villeneuve-Saint-Germain |
| 02360 | 02190 | Villeneuve-sur-Aisne |
| 02806 | 02130 | Villeneuve-sur-Fère |
| 02807 | 02300 | Villequier-Aumont |
| 02808 | 02420 | Villeret |
| 02809 | 02130 | Villers-Agron-Aiguizy |
| 02810 | 02600 | Villers-Cotterêts |
| 02812 | 02600 | Villers-Hélon |
| 02813 | 02240 | Villers-le-Sec |
| 02814 | 02120 | Villers-lès-Guise |
| 02815 | 02590 | Villers-Saint-Christophe |
| 02816 | 02130 | Villers-sur-Fère |
| 02817 | 02220 | Ville-Savoye |
| 02818 | 02310 | Villiers-Saint-Denis |
| 02819 | 02340 | Vincy-Reuil-et-Magny |
| 02820 | 02300 | Viry-Noureuil |
| 02821 | 02870 | Vivaise |
| 02822 | 02600 | Vivières |
| 02823 | 02140 | Voharies |
| 02824 | 02860 | Vorges |
| 02826 | 02140 | Voulpaix |
| 02827 | 02250 | Voyenne |
| 02828 | 02880 | Vregny |
| 02829 | 02880 | Vuillery |
| 02830 | 02630 | Wassigny |
| 02831 | 02830 | Watigny |
| 02832 | 02120 | Wiège-Faty |
| 02833 | 02500 | Wimy |
| 02834 | 02320 | Wissignicourt |
