= Canton of Laon-2 =

Coordinates: 49.56°N 3.63°E

- Canton
- Situation of the canton of Laon-2 in the department of Aisne
- Country: France
- Region: Hauts-de-France
- Department: Aisne
- No. of communes: {{{nbcomm}}}
- Population (2023): 24,784
- INSEE code: 0210

The canton of Laon-2 is an administrative division of the Aisne department, in northern France. It was created at the French canton reorganisation which came into effect in March 2015. Its seat is in Laon.

It consists of the following communes:

1. Arrancy
2. Athies-sous-Laon
3. Bièvres
4. Bruyères-et-Montbérault
5. Cerny-en-Laonnois
6. Chamouille
7. Chérêt
8. Chivy-lès-Étouvelles
9. Colligis-Crandelain
10. Eppes
11. Étouvelles
12. Festieux
13. Laon (partly)
14. Laval-en-Laonnois
15. Lierval
16. Martigny-Courpierre
17. Montchâlons
18. Monthenault
19. Nouvion-le-Vineux
20. Orgeval
21. Parfondru
22. Presles-et-Thierny
23. Samoussy
24. Veslud
25. Vorges
