= Laval-en-Laonnois =

- Commune
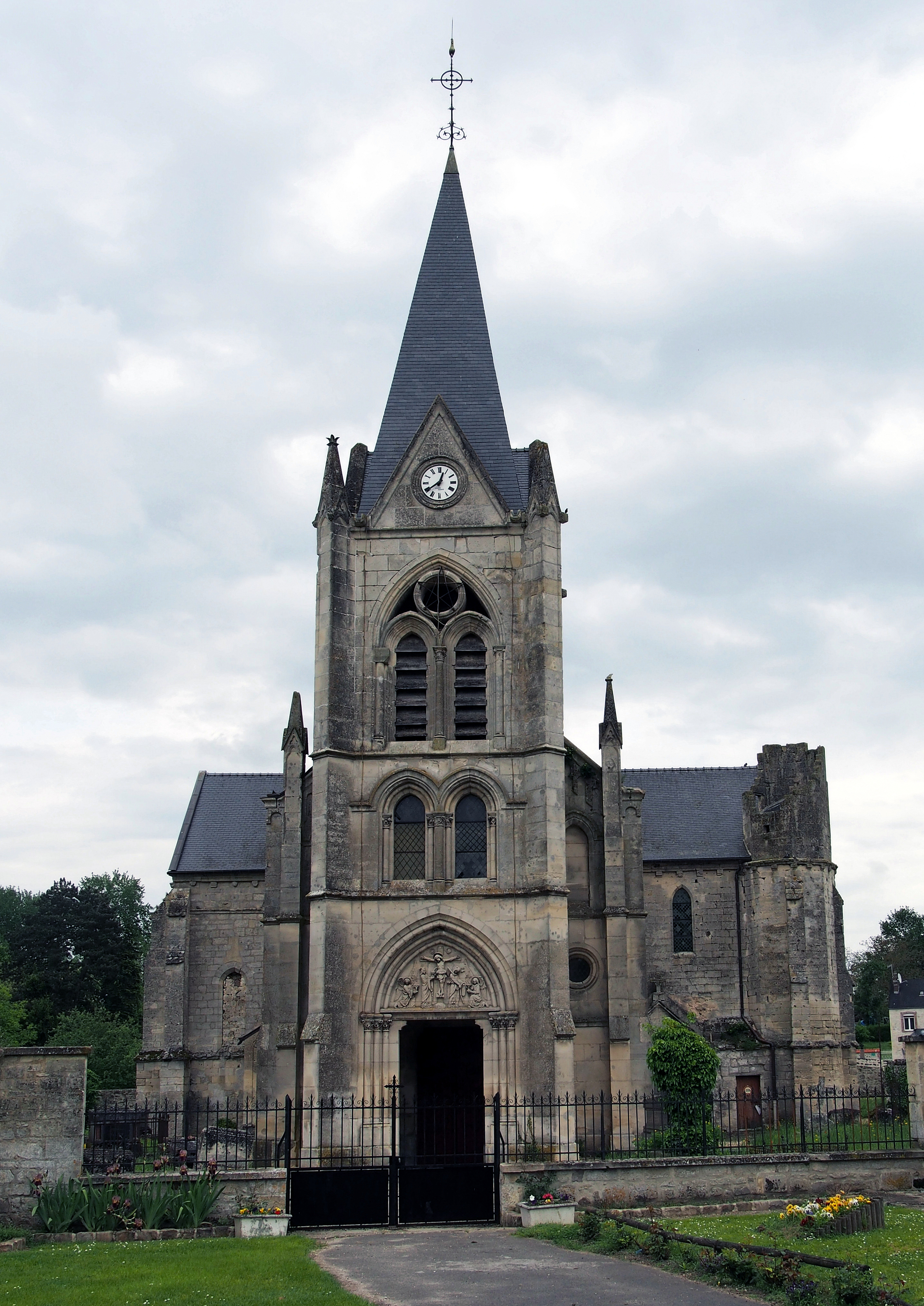
- The church of Laval-en-Laonnois
- Location of Laval-en-Laonnois
- Location within France Location within Hauts-de-France
- Coordinates: 49°30′05″N 3°35′47″E
- Country: France
- Region: Hauts-de-France
- Department: Aisne
- Arrondissement: Laon
- Canton: Laon-2
- Intercommunality: CA Pays de Laon

Government
  - Mayor (2026–32): Gilbert Moncourtois
- Area^{1}: 4.51 km^{2} (1.74 sq mi)
- Elevation: 80 m (260 ft)
- Highest elevation: 178 m (584 ft)
- Lowest elevation: 57 m (187 ft)
- Population (2023): 251
  - Density: 55.7/km^{2} (144/sq mi)
- Time zone: UTC+01:00 (CET)
  - Summer (DST): UTC+02:00 (CEST)
- INSEE/Postal code: 02413 /02860
- ^{1} French Land Register data, which excludes lakes, ponds, glaciers > 1 km^{2} (0.386 sq mi or 247 acres) and river estuaries.

Laval-en-Laonnois is a commune in the Aisne department in Hauts-de-France in northern France.

== Population ==
Historical population
Year	Pop.	±% p.a.
1968	146	—
1975	151	+0.48%
1982	163	+1.10%
1990	202	+2.72%
1999	213	+0.59%
2007	246	+1.82%
2012	255	+0.72%
2017	250	−0.40%
2023	251	+0.07%
Source: INSEE

== See also ==
- Communes of the Aisne department
