= Chivy-lès-Étouvelles =

- Commune
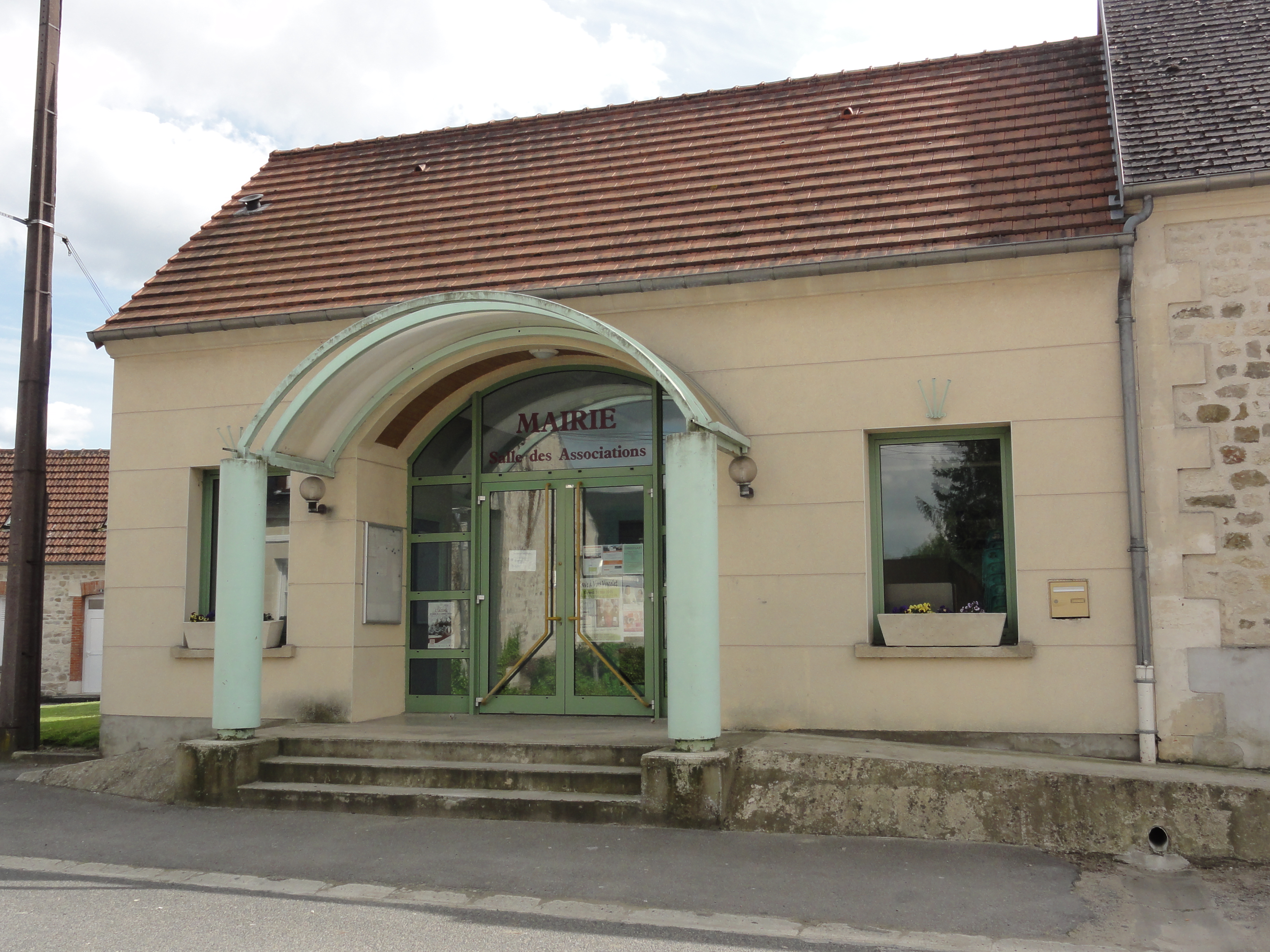
- The town hall of Chivy-lès-Étouvelles
- Location of Chivy-lès-Étouvelles
- Location within France Location within Hauts-de-France
- Coordinates: 49°31′43″N 3°35′08″E
- Country: France
- Region: Hauts-de-France
- Department: Aisne
- Arrondissement: Laon
- Canton: Laon-2
- Intercommunality: CA Pays de Laon

Government
  - Mayor (2026–32): Jean-Marie Rabouille
- Area^{1}: 3.54 km^{2} (1.37 sq mi)
- Elevation: 65 m (213 ft)
- Highest elevation: 79 m (259 ft)
- Lowest elevation: 57 m (187 ft)
- Population (2023): 484
  - Density: 137/km^{2} (354/sq mi)
- Time zone: UTC+01:00 (CET)
  - Summer (DST): UTC+02:00 (CEST)
- INSEE/Postal code: 02191 /02000
- ^{1} French Land Register data, which excludes lakes, ponds, glaciers > 1 km^{2} (0.386 sq mi or 247 acres) and river estuaries.

Chivy-lès-Étouvelles (French pronunciation: [ʃivi lɛ.z‿etuvɛl], literally Chivy near Étouvelles) is a commune in Aisne, a department in Hauts-de-France in northern France.

== Population ==
Historical population
Year	Pop.	±% p.a.
1968	446	—
1975	479	+1.02%
1982	472	−0.21%
1990	515	+1.10%
1999	542	+0.57%
2007	482	−1.46%
2012	503	+0.86%
2017	510	+0.28%
2023	484	−0.87%
Source: INSEE

== See also ==
- Communes of the Aisne department
