= Samoussy =

- Commune
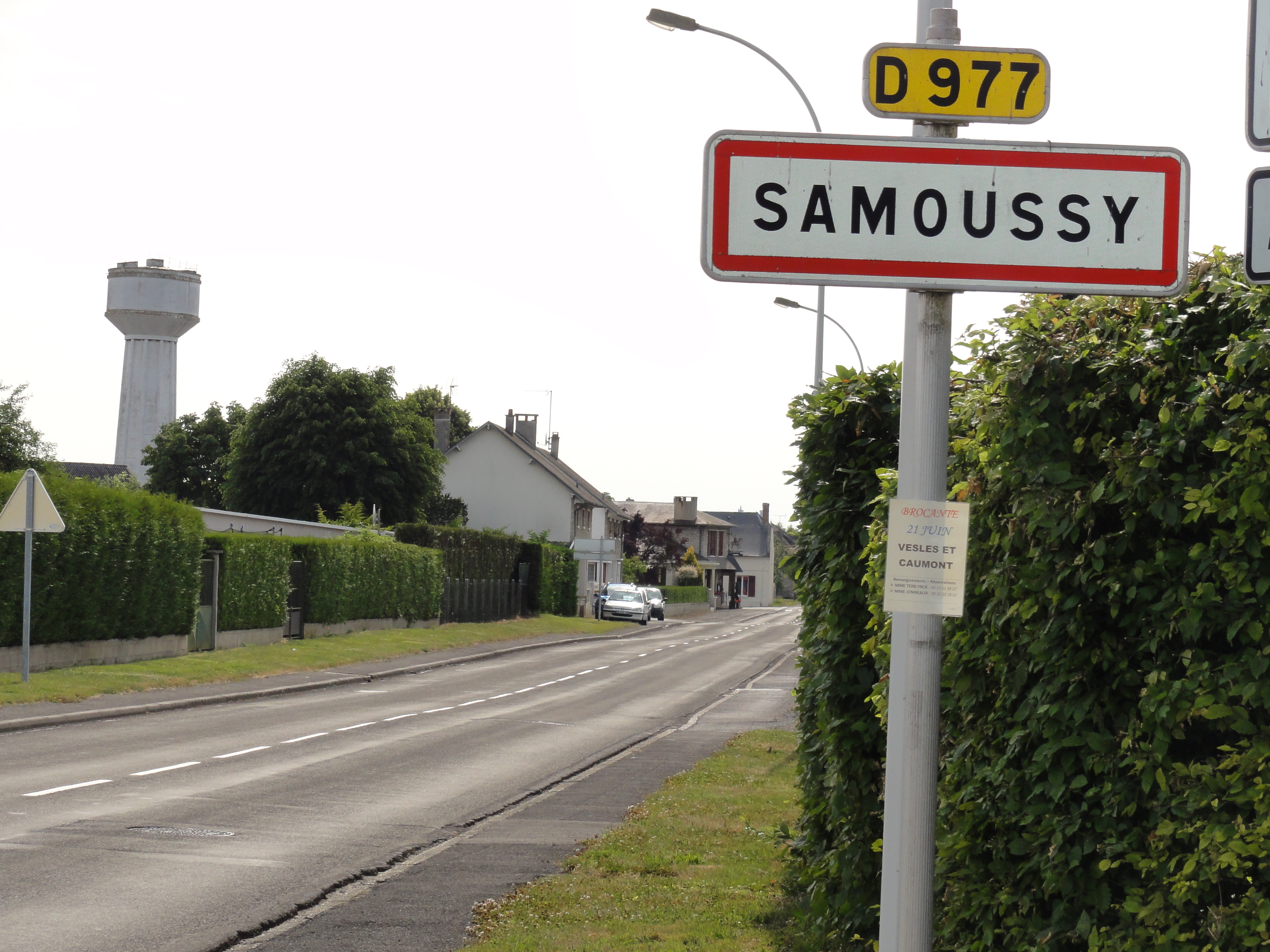
- The road into Samoussy
- Location of Samoussy
- Location within France Location within Hauts-de-France
- Coordinates: 49°35′09″N 3°44′05″E
- Country: France
- Region: Hauts-de-France
- Department: Aisne
- Arrondissement: Laon
- Canton: Laon-2
- Intercommunality: CA Pays de Laon

Government
  - Mayor (2026–32): Harry Rivière
- Area^{1}: 25.04 km^{2} (9.67 sq mi)
- Elevation: 84 m (276 ft)
- Highest elevation: 100 m (330 ft)
- Lowest elevation: 71 m (233 ft)
- Population (2023): 384
  - Density: 15.3/km^{2} (39.7/sq mi)
- Time zone: UTC+01:00 (CET)
  - Summer (DST): UTC+02:00 (CEST)
- INSEE/Postal code: 02697 /02840
- ^{1} French Land Register data, which excludes lakes, ponds, glaciers > 1 km^{2} (0.386 sq mi or 247 acres) and river estuaries.

Samoussy (French pronunciation: [samusi]) is a commune in the Aisne department in Hauts-de-France in northern France.

== Population ==
Historical population
Year	Pop.	±% p.a.
1968	203	—
1975	210	+0.49%
1982	220	+0.67%
1990	410	+8.09%
1999	376	−0.96%
2007	369	−0.23%
2012	344	−1.39%
2017	387	+2.38%
2023	384	−0.13%
Source: INSEE

== See also ==
- Communes of the Aisne department
