= Berrieux =

- Commune
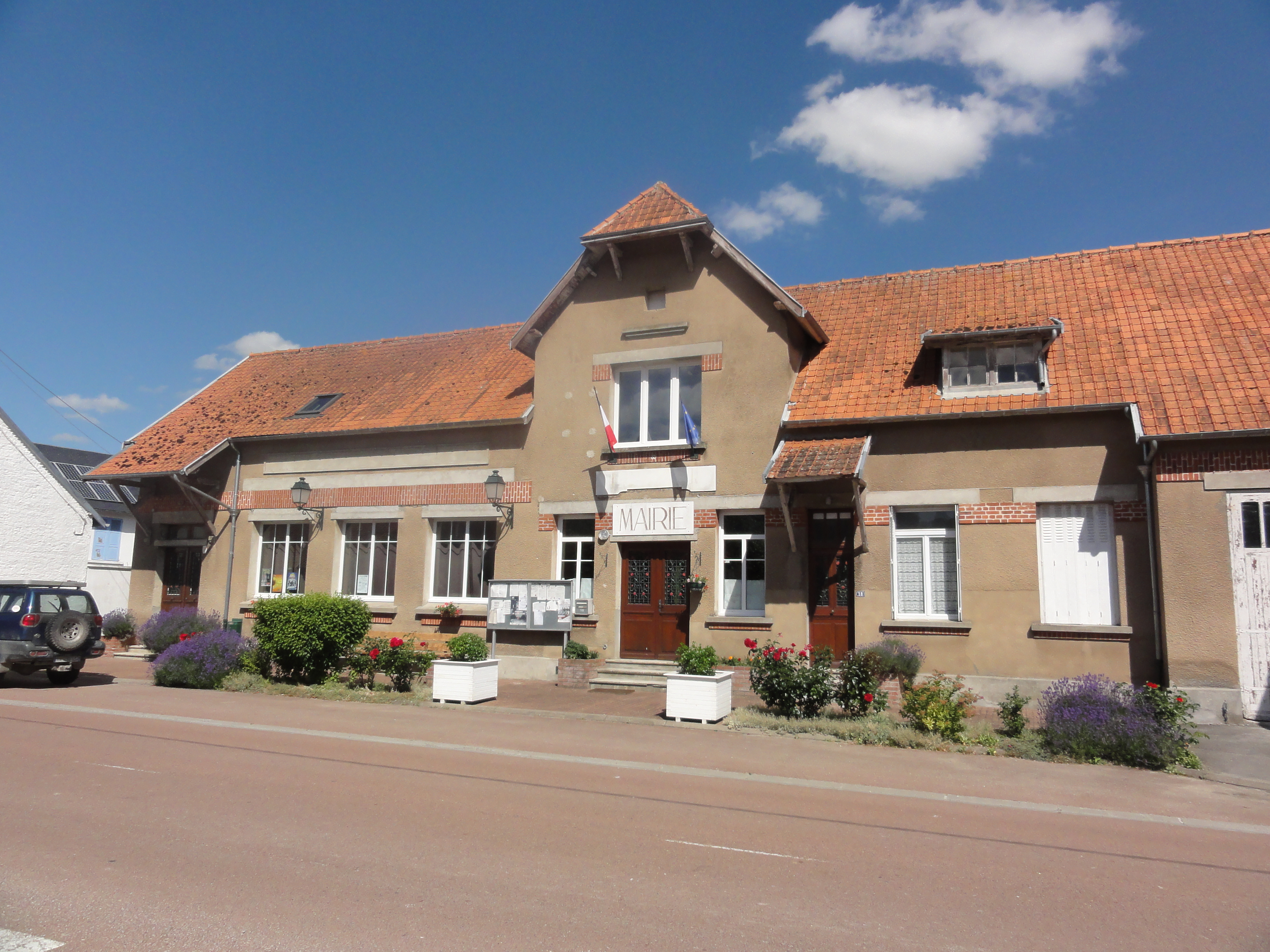
- Town hall
- Location of Berrieux
- Location within France Location within Hauts-de-France
- Coordinates: 49°29′19″N 3°50′56″E
- Country: France
- Region: Hauts-de-France
- Department: Aisne
- Arrondissement: Laon
- Canton: Villeneuve-sur-Aisne
- Intercommunality: Chemin des Dames

Government
  - Mayor (2026–32): Gilles Payen
- Area^{1}: 4.98 km^{2} (1.92 sq mi)
- Elevation: 98 m (322 ft)
- Highest elevation: 159 m (522 ft)
- Lowest elevation: 72 m (236 ft)
- Population (2023): 178
  - Density: 35.7/km^{2} (92.6/sq mi)
- Time zone: UTC+01:00 (CET)
  - Summer (DST): UTC+02:00 (CEST)
- INSEE/Postal code: 02072 /02820
- ^{1} French Land Register data, which excludes lakes, ponds, glaciers > 1 km^{2} (0.386 sq mi or 247 acres) and river estuaries.

Berrieux (French pronunciation: [beʁjø]) is a commune in the department of Aisne in Hauts-de-France in northern France.

== History ==
During the First World War, Berrieux was located on the front line between the French and German forces. The village was completely destroyed and rebuilt after the war.

== Population ==
Historical population
Year	Pop.	±% p.a.
1968	162	—
1975	142	−1.86%
1982	166	+2.26%
1990	162	−0.30%
1999	161	−0.07%
2007	165	+0.31%
2012	184	+2.20%
2017	188	+0.43%
2023	178	−0.91%
Source: INSEE

== See also ==
- Communes of the Aisne department
