= Martigny-Courpierre =

- Commune
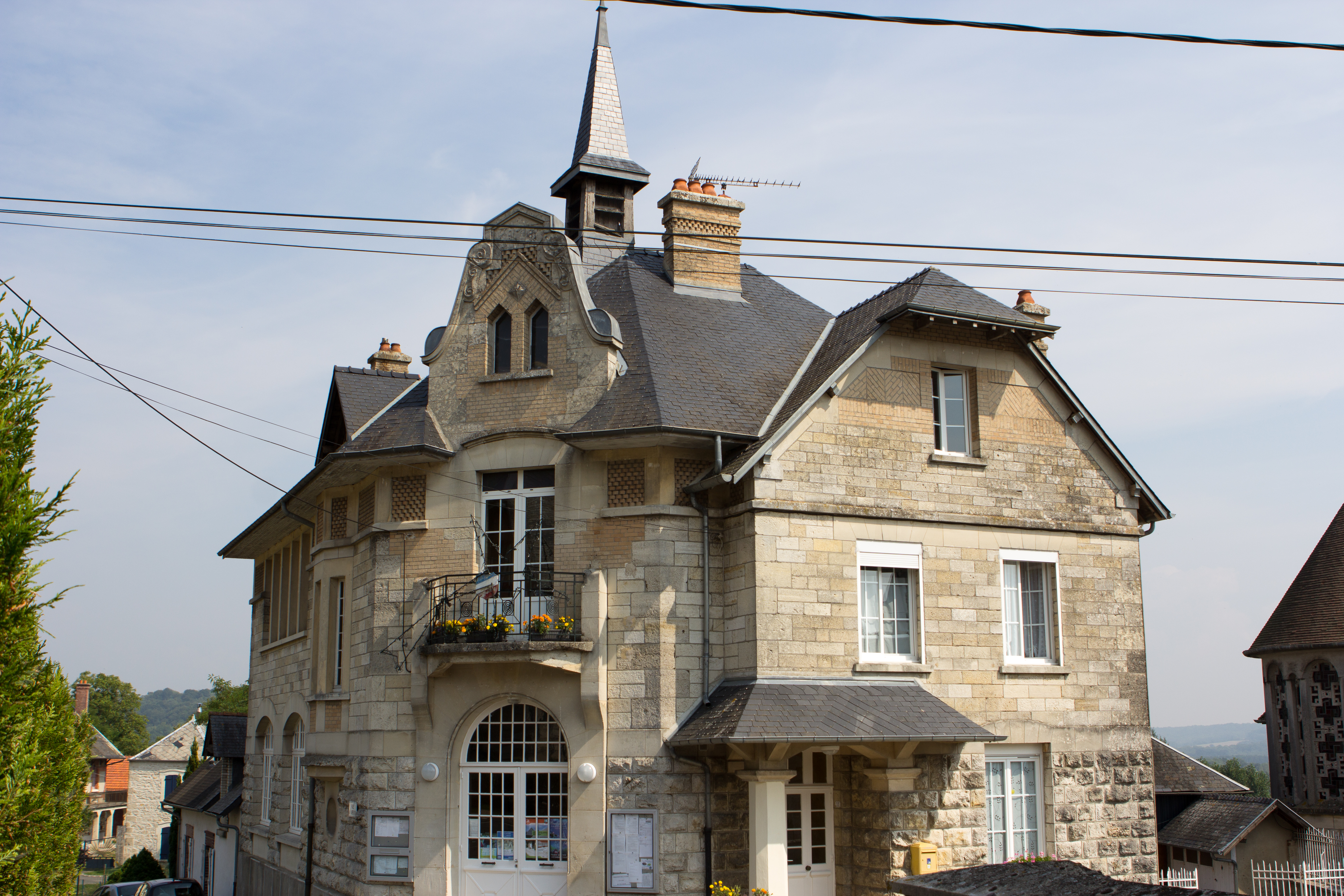
- The town hall of Martigny-Courpierre
- Location of Martigny-Courpierre
- Location within France Location within Hauts-de-France
- Coordinates: 49°29′27″N 3°40′51″E
- Country: France
- Region: Hauts-de-France
- Department: Aisne
- Arrondissement: Laon
- Canton: Laon-2
- Intercommunality: CA Pays de Laon

Government
  - Mayor (2026–32): Christian Lambert
- Area^{1}: 4.46 km^{2} (1.72 sq mi)
- Elevation: 80 m (260 ft)
- Highest elevation: 196 m (643 ft)
- Lowest elevation: 78 m (256 ft)
- Population (2023): 130
  - Density: 29/km^{2} (75/sq mi)
- Time zone: UTC+01:00 (CET)
  - Summer (DST): UTC+02:00 (CEST)
- INSEE/Postal code: 02471 /02860
- ^{1} French Land Register data, which excludes lakes, ponds, glaciers > 1 km^{2} (0.386 sq mi or 247 acres) and river estuaries.

Martigny-Courpierre (French pronunciation: [maʁtiɲi kuʁpjɛʁ]) is a commune in the Aisne department in Hauts-de-France in northern France.

== Population ==
Historical population
Year	Pop.	±% p.a.
1968	115	—
1975	105	−1.29%
1982	91	−2.02%
1990	103	+1.56%
1999	122	+1.90%
2007	112	−1.06%
2012	120	+1.39%
2017	124	+0.66%
2023	130	+0.79%
Source: INSEE

== See also ==
- Communes of the Aisne department
