= Montchâlons =

- Commune
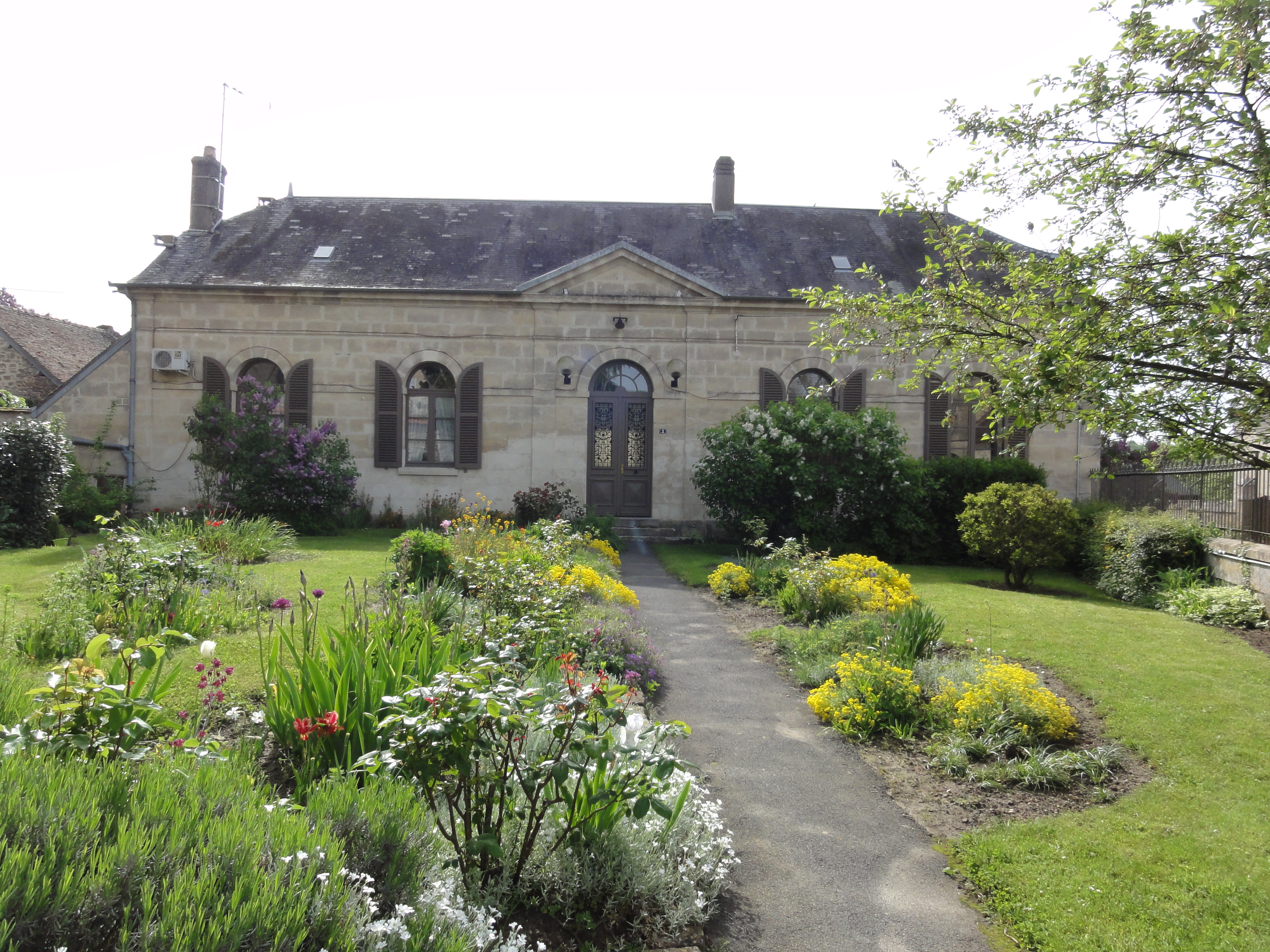
- The town hall of Montchâlons
- Location of Montchâlons
- Location within France Location within Hauts-de-France
- Coordinates: 49°30′51″N 3°43′43″E
- Country: France
- Region: Hauts-de-France
- Department: Aisne
- Arrondissement: Laon
- Canton: Laon-2
- Intercommunality: CA Pays de Laon

Government
  - Mayor (2026–32): Louis Bourgeois
- Area^{1}: 6.76 km^{2} (2.61 sq mi)
- Elevation: 180 m (590 ft)
- Highest elevation: 206 m (676 ft)
- Lowest elevation: 94 m (308 ft)
- Population (2023): 63
  - Density: 9.3/km^{2} (24/sq mi)
- Time zone: UTC+01:00 (CET)
  - Summer (DST): UTC+02:00 (CEST)
- INSEE/Postal code: 02501 /02860
- ^{1} French Land Register data, which excludes lakes, ponds, glaciers > 1 km^{2} (0.386 sq mi or 247 acres) and river estuaries.

Montchâlons (French pronunciation: [mɔ̃ʃalɔ̃]) is a commune in the Aisne department in Hauts-de-France in northern France.

== Population ==
Historical population
| Year | Pop. | ±% p.a. |
|---|---|---|
| 1968 | 76 | — |
| 1975 | 79 | +0.55% |
| 1982 | 65 | −2.75% |
| 1990 | 65 | +0.00% |
| 1999 | 65 | +0.00% |
| 2007 | 67 | +0.38% |
| 2012 | 61 | −1.86% |
| 2017 | 84 | +6.61% |
| 2023 | 63 | −4.68% |
Source: INSEE

== See also ==
- Communes of the Aisne department
