= Athies-sous-Laon =

- Commune
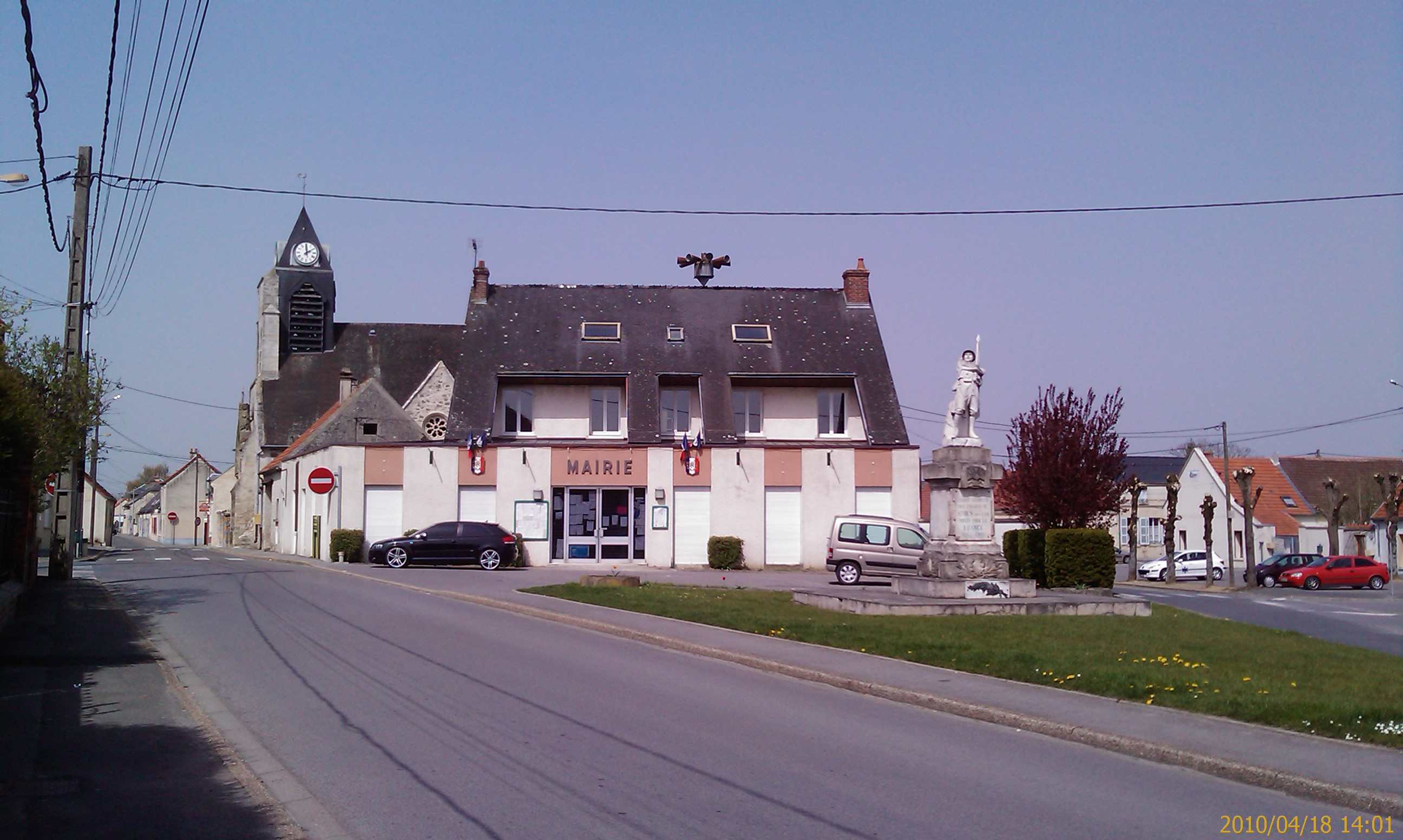
- Town hall
- Location of Athies-sous-Laon
- Location within France Location within Hauts-de-France
- Coordinates: 49°34′26″N 3°41′02″E
- Country: France
- Region: Hauts-de-France
- Department: Aisne
- Arrondissement: Laon
- Canton: Laon-2
- Intercommunality: CA Pays de Laon

Government
  - Mayor (2026–32): Sandrine Delplanque
- Area^{1}: 15.44 km^{2} (5.96 sq mi)
- Highest elevation: 87 m (285 ft)
- Lowest elevation: 64 m (210 ft)
- Population (2023): 2,578
  - Density: 167.0/km^{2} (432.4/sq mi)
- Time zone: UTC+01:00 (CET)
  - Summer (DST): UTC+02:00 (CEST)
- INSEE/Postal code: 02028 /02840
- ^{1} French Land Register data, which excludes lakes, ponds, glaciers > 1 km^{2} (0.386 sq mi or 247 acres) and river estuaries.

Athies-sous-Laon (French pronunciation: [ati su lɑ̃], literally Athies under Laon is a commune in the department of Aisne in the Hauts-de-France region of northern France.

== Geography ==
Athies-sous-Laon is located 3 km east of Laon and 15 km west of Sissonne. It can be accessed by the D977 from Laon which continues east to Gizy. The Autoroute des Anglais (A26, E17) traverses the commune from north to southeast, but there is no exit in the commune. There is also a railway line going east from Laon with a station in the commune northeast of the town. The town area of Athies-sous-Laon is quite large, but is separated from Laon by farmland. There is the remains of part of a disused airbase in the north of the commune, but most of the rest of the commune is farmland with a small area of forest near the town.

The Ru du Barentons stream flows from the north where it forms part of the northern border of the commune and continues southeast through the town then west to join the Marais Canal.

== Administration ==
List of Successive Mayors of Athies-sous-Laon

From	To	Name	Party
1959	2001	Jacques Camus	PCF
2001	2008	Germain Devin	DVG
2008	2026	Yves Brun	MRC
2026	incumbent	Sandrine Delplanque	

== Population ==
Historical population
Year	Pop.	±% p.a.
1968	1,603	—
1975	1,894	+2.41%
1982	2,081	+1.35%
1990	2,128	+0.28%
1999	2,132	+0.02%
2007	2,307	+0.99%
2012	2,624	+2.61%
2017	2,604	−0.15%
2023	2,578	−0.17%
Source: INSEE

== Sites and Monuments ==
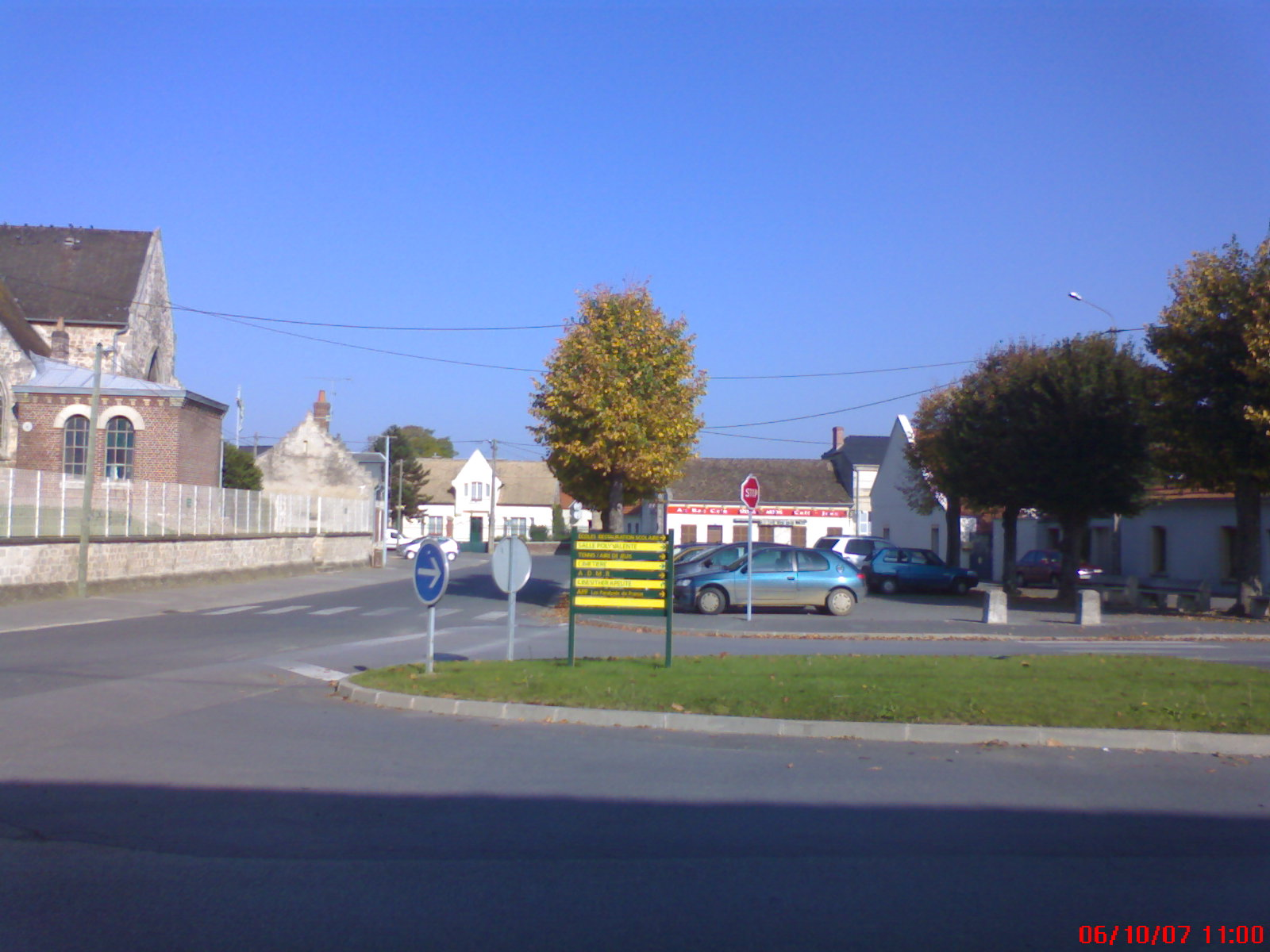
11 November Square at Athies-sous-Laon

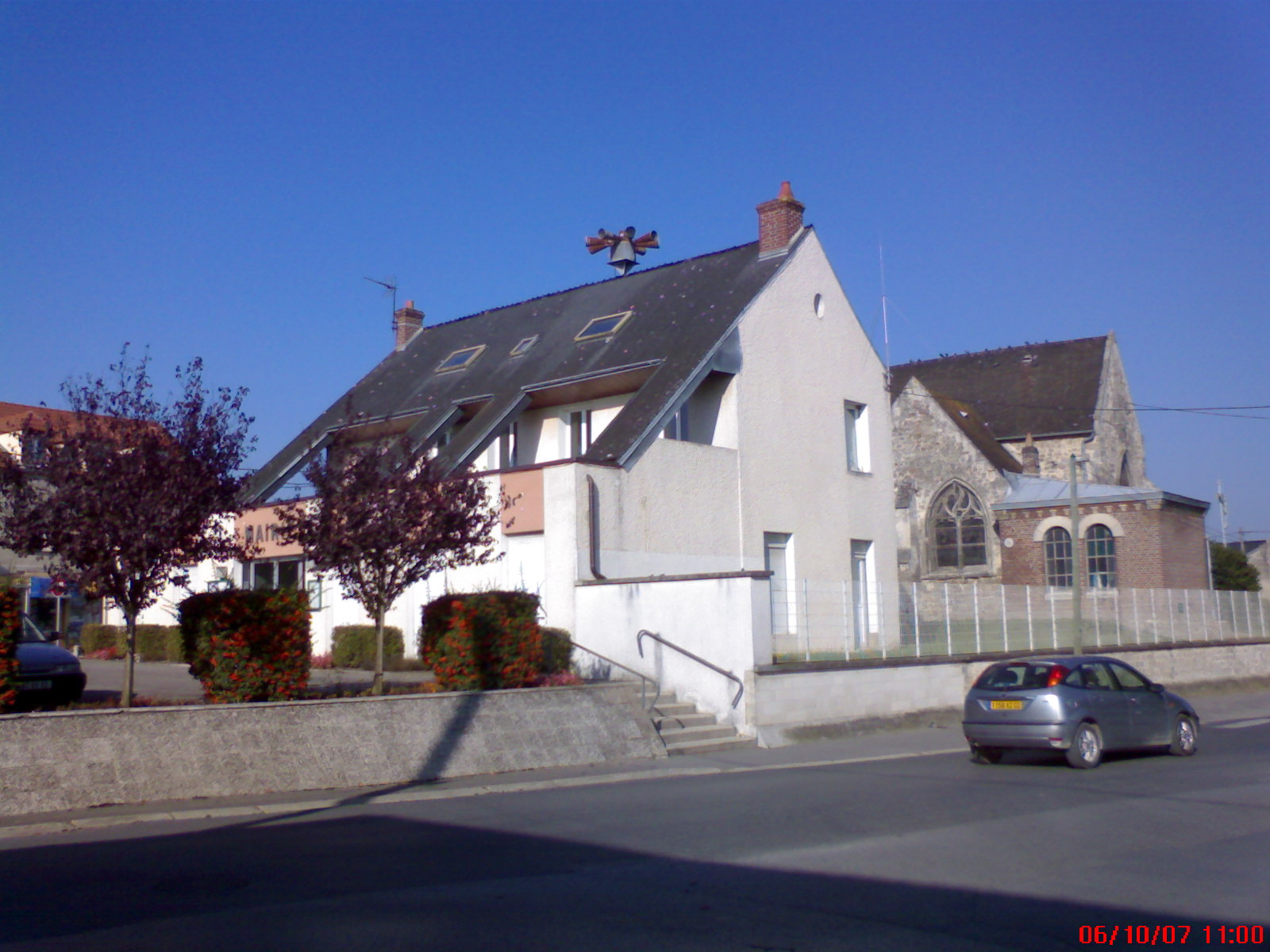
Town Hall at Athies-sous-Laon

== Notable People linked to the commune ==
Sub-Lieutenant César Méléra of the Colonial Infantry was born in Athies-sous-Laon on 14 July 1884, mobilized on 2 August 1914, fought at the Yser, in Artois, the Champagne, and in Verdun. He was severely wounded in Verdun on 18 August 1916, three times mentioned in dispatches, Chevalier of the Legion of Honour. He died for France struck by a bullet to the heart at Brin (Lorraine) on 25 October 1918. He was the Author of the book Verdun (June–July 1916) the Mountain of Reims (May–June 1918), Editions de La Lucarne, 1925 (in French). His name appears in the Panthéon among dead writers of the Field of Honour during the 1914-1918 war.

== See also ==
- Communes of the Aisne department

=== External links ===
- Athies-sous-Laon on the old National Geographic Institute website (in French)
- Athies-sous-Laon unofficial website (in French)
- Bell Towers website (in French)
- 40000 Bell Towers website (in French)
- Athies-sous-Laon on Géoportail, National Geographic Institute (IGN) website (in French)
- Athies on the 1750 Cassini Map
