= Communauté d'agglomération du Pays de Laon =

Pays de Laon
- Communauté d'agglomération
- Interactive map of Pays de Laon
- Coordinates: 49°33′N 03°38′E
- Country: France
- Region: Hauts-de-France
- Department: Aisne
- No. of communes: {{{nbcomm}}}
- Established: 2014
- Area: 315.4 km^{2} (121.8 sq mi)
- Population (2019): 42,147
  - Density: 133.6/km^{2} (346.1/sq mi)
- Website: www.ca-paysdelaon.fr

Communauté d'agglomération du Pays de Laon is the communauté d'agglomération, an intercommunal structure, centred on the town of Laon. It is located in the Aisne department, in the Hauts-de-France region, northern France. Created in 2014, its seat is in Aulnois-sous-Laon. Its area is 315.4 km^{2}. Its population was 42,147 in 2019, of which 24,304 in Laon proper.

== Composition ==
The communauté d'agglomération consists of the following 38 communes:

1. Arrancy
2. Athies-sous-Laon
3. Aulnois-sous-Laon
4. Besny-et-Loizy
5. Bièvres
6. Bruyères-et-Montbérault
7. Bucy-lès-Cerny
8. Cerny-en-Laonnois
9. Cerny-lès-Bucy
10. Cessières-Suzy
11. Chambry
12. Chamouille
13. Chérêt
14. Chivy-lès-Étouvelles
15. Clacy-et-Thierret
16. Colligis-Crandelain
17. Crépy
18. Eppes
19. Étouvelles
20. Festieux
21. Laniscourt
22. Laon
23. Laval-en-Laonnois
24. Lierval
25. Martigny-Courpierre
26. Molinchart
27. Mons-en-Laonnois
28. Montchâlons
29. Monthenault
30. Nouvion-le-Vineux
31. Orgeval
32. Parfondru
33. Presles-et-Thierny
34. Samoussy
35. Vaucelles-et-Beffecourt
36. Veslud
37. Vivaise
38. Vorges
