= Chérêt =

- Commune
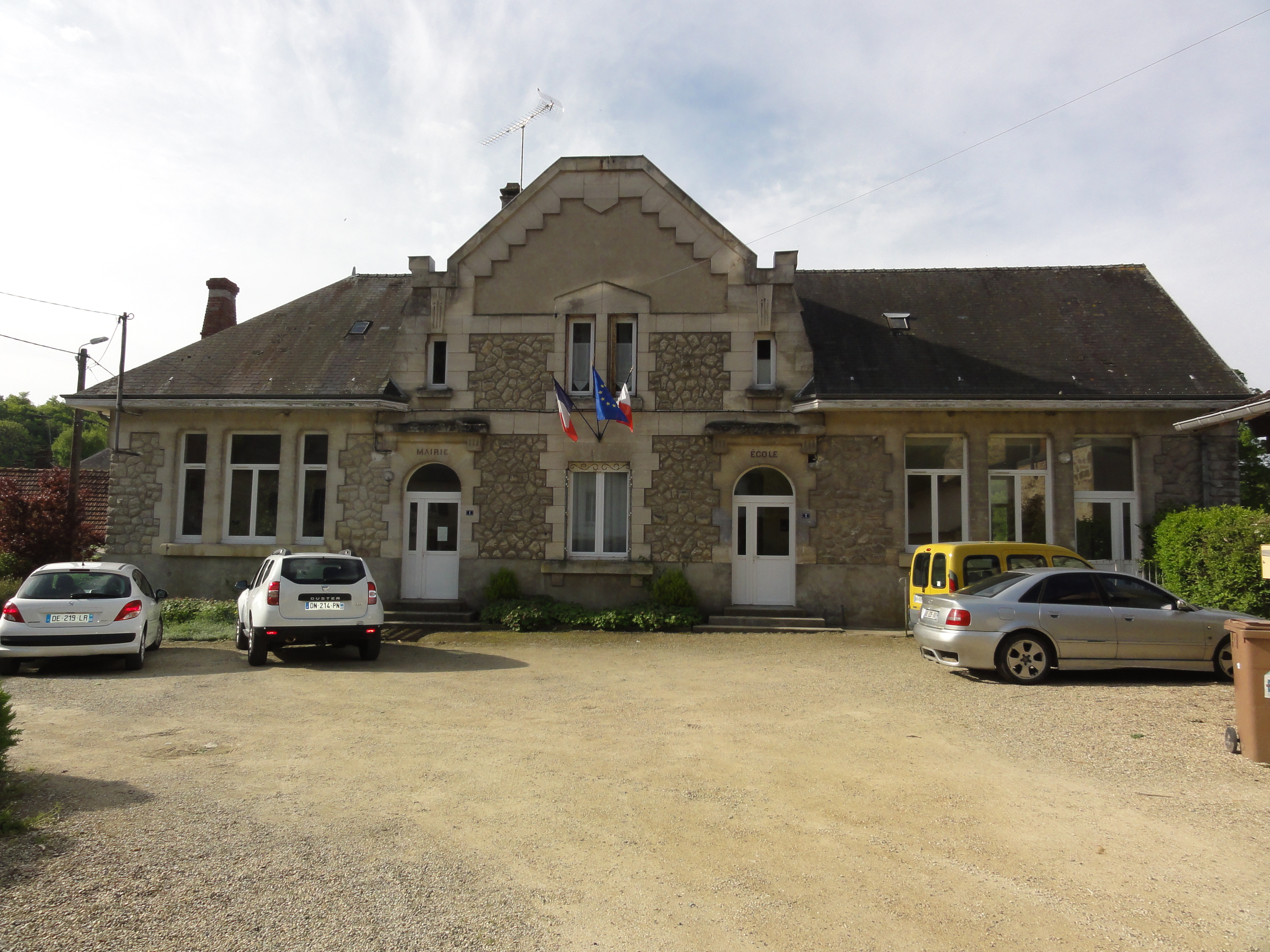
- The town hall and school of Chérêt

- Coat of arms
- Location of Chérêt
- Location within France Location within Hauts-de-France
- Coordinates: 49°30′57″N 3°41′06″E
- Country: France
- Region: Hauts-de-France
- Department: Aisne
- Arrondissement: Laon
- Canton: Laon-2
- Intercommunality: CA Pays de Laon

Government
  - Mayor (2026–32): Virginie Beaudoin
- Area^{1}: 3.71 km^{2} (1.43 sq mi)
- Elevation: 190 m (620 ft)
- Highest elevation: 189 m (620 ft)
- Lowest elevation: 91 m (299 ft)
- Population (2023): 147
  - Density: 39.6/km^{2} (103/sq mi)
- Time zone: UTC+01:00 (CET)
  - Summer (DST): UTC+02:00 (CEST)
- INSEE/Postal code: 02177 /02860
- ^{1} French Land Register data, which excludes lakes, ponds, glaciers > 1 km^{2} (0.386 sq mi or 247 acres) and river estuaries.

Chérêt (French pronunciation: [ʃeʁɛ]) is a commune in the Aisne department in Hauts-de-France in northern France.

== Population ==
Historical population
Year	Pop.	±% p.a.
1968	88	—
1975	111	+3.37%
1982	111	+0.00%
1990	122	+1.19%
1999	131	+0.79%
2007	120	−1.09%
2012	128	+1.30%
2017	142	+2.10%
2023	147	+0.58%
Source: INSEE

== See also ==
- Communes of the Aisne department
