= Bièvres, Aisne =

Bièvres
- Commune
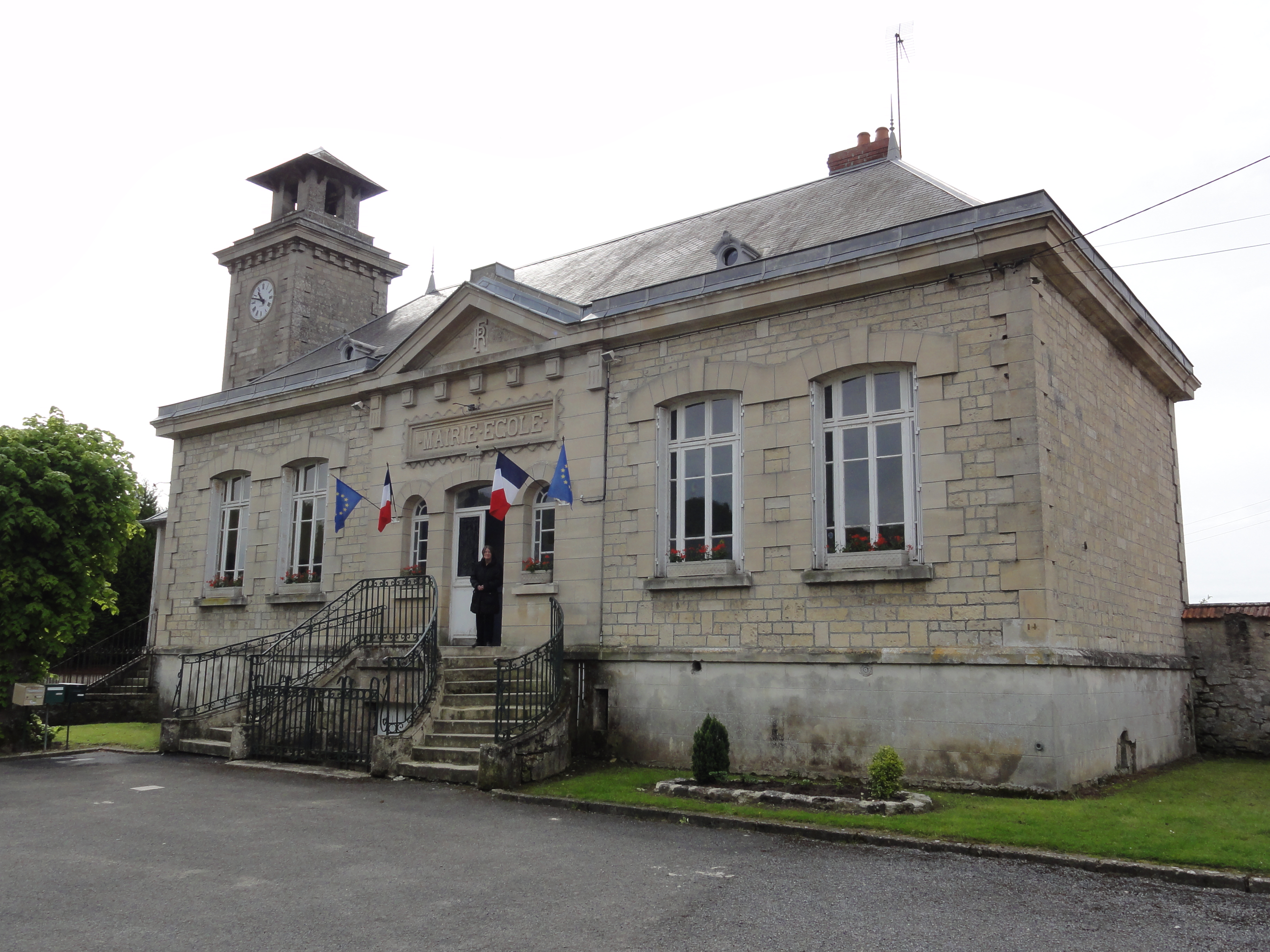
- The town hall and school of Bièvres
- Location of Bièvres
- Location within France Location within Hauts-de-France
- Coordinates: 49°29′39″N 3°42′43″E
- Country: France
- Region: Hauts-de-France
- Department: Aisne
- Arrondissement: Laon
- Canton: Laon-2
- Intercommunality: CA Pays de Laon

Government
  - Mayor (2026–32): Pierre Biedal
- Area^{1}: 2.64 km^{2} (1.02 sq mi)
- Elevation: 115 m (377 ft)
- Highest elevation: 184 m (604 ft)
- Lowest elevation: 82 m (269 ft)
- Population (2023): 80
  - Density: 30/km^{2} (78/sq mi)
- Time zone: UTC+01:00 (CET)
  - Summer (DST): UTC+02:00 (CEST)
- INSEE/Postal code: 02088 /02860
- ^{1} French Land Register data, which excludes lakes, ponds, glaciers > 1 km^{2} (0.386 sq mi or 247 acres) and river estuaries.

Bièvres (French pronunciation: [bjɛvʁ]) is a commune in the department of Aisne in Hauts-de-France in northern France.

== Population ==
Historical population
| Year | Pop. | ±% p.a. |
|---|---|---|
| 1968 | 61 | — |
| 1975 | 64 | +0.69% |
| 1982 | 65 | +0.22% |
| 1990 | 84 | +3.26% |
| 1999 | 76 | −1.11% |
| 2007 | 77 | +0.16% |
| 2012 | 69 | −2.17% |
| 2017 | 88 | +4.98% |
| 2023 | 80 | −1.58% |
Source: INSEE

== See also ==
- Communes of the Aisne department
