= Monthenault =

- Commune
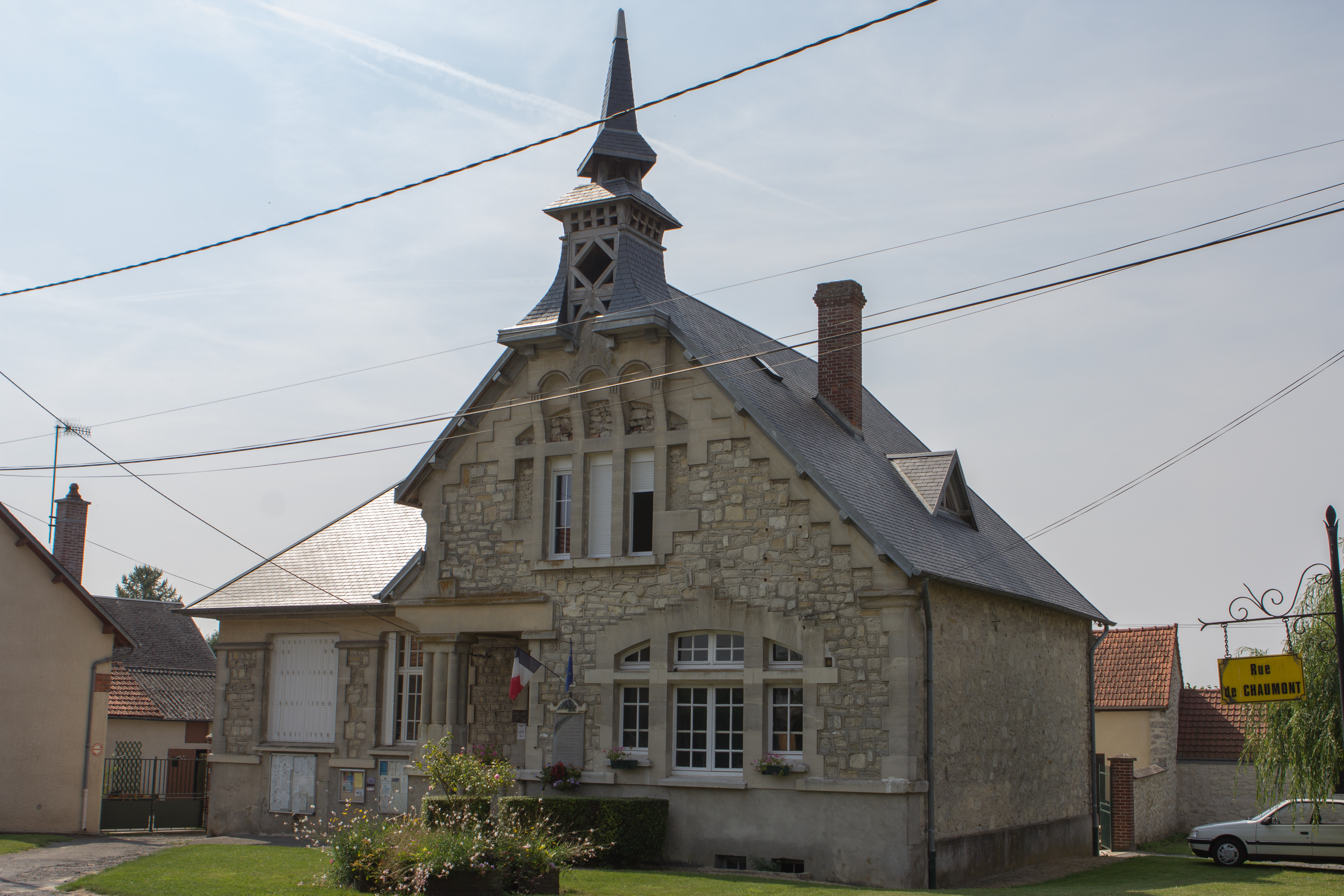
- The town hall of Monthenault
- Location of Monthenault
- Location within France Location within Hauts-de-France
- Coordinates: 49°29′18″N 3°40′04″E
- Country: France
- Region: Hauts-de-France
- Department: Aisne
- Arrondissement: Laon
- Canton: Laon-2
- Intercommunality: CA Pays de Laon

Government
  - Mayor (2026–32): Abdelmalek Benderradji
- Area^{1}: 2.94 km^{2} (1.14 sq mi)
- Elevation: 186 m (610 ft)
- Highest elevation: 198 m (650 ft)
- Lowest elevation: 101 m (331 ft)
- Population (2023): 140
  - Density: 48/km^{2} (120/sq mi)
- Time zone: UTC+01:00 (CET)
  - Summer (DST): UTC+02:00 (CEST)
- INSEE/Postal code: 02508 /02860
- ^{1} French Land Register data, which excludes lakes, ponds, glaciers > 1 km^{2} (0.386 sq mi or 247 acres) and river estuaries.

Monthenault (French pronunciation: [mɔ̃tno]) is a commune in the Aisne department in Hauts-de-France in northern France.

== Population ==
Historical population
Year	Pop.	±% p.a.
1968	99	—
1975	94	−0.74%
1982	88	−0.94%
1990	102	+1.86%
1999	106	+0.43%
2007	112	+0.69%
2012	139	+4.41%
2017	152	+1.80%
2023	140	−1.36%
Source: INSEE

== See also ==
- Communes of the Aisne department
