= Presles-et-Thierny =

- Commune
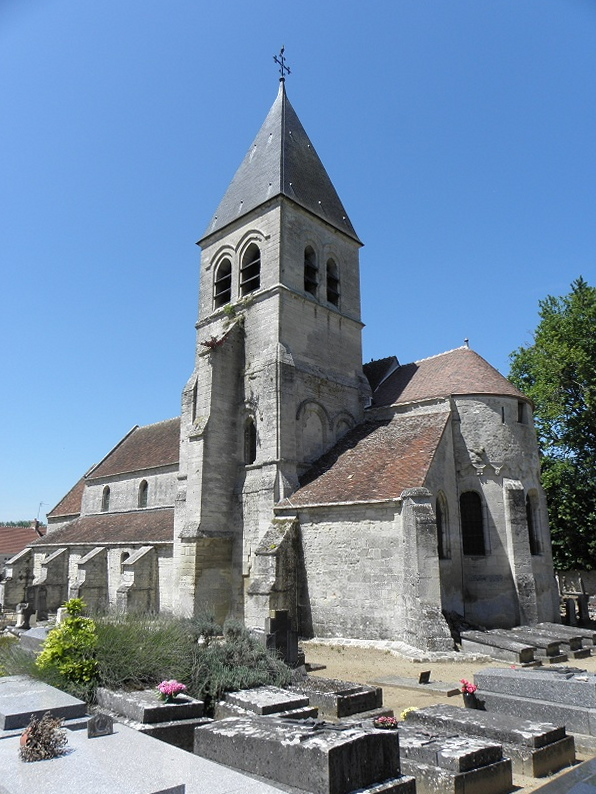
- The church of Presles-et-Thierny
- Location of Presles-et-Thierny
- Location within France Location within Hauts-de-France
- Coordinates: 49°30′30″N 3°37′40″E
- Country: France
- Region: Hauts-de-France
- Department: Aisne
- Arrondissement: Laon
- Canton: Laon-2
- Intercommunality: CA Pays de Laon

Government
  - Mayor (2026–32): Marc Kyriacos
- Area^{1}: 8.33 km^{2} (3.22 sq mi)
- Elevation: 110 m (360 ft)
- Highest elevation: 191 m (627 ft)
- Lowest elevation: 62 m (203 ft)
- Population (2023): 401
  - Density: 48.1/km^{2} (125/sq mi)
- Time zone: UTC+01:00 (CET)
  - Summer (DST): UTC+02:00 (CEST)
- INSEE/Postal code: 02621 /02860
- ^{1} French Land Register data, which excludes lakes, ponds, glaciers > 1 km^{2} (0.386 sq mi or 247 acres) and river estuaries.

Presles-et-Thierny (French pronunciation: [pʁɛl e tjɛʁni], lit. 'Presles and Thierny') is a commune in the Aisne department in Hauts-de-France in northern France.

== Population ==
Historical population
Year	Pop.	±% p.a.
1968	279	—
1975	308	+1.42%
1982	338	+1.34%
1990	325	−0.49%
1999	344	+0.63%
2007	363	+0.67%
2012	399	+1.91%
2017	385	−0.71%
2023	401	+0.68%
Source: INSEE

== See also ==
- Communes of the Aisne department
