= Lierval =

- Commune
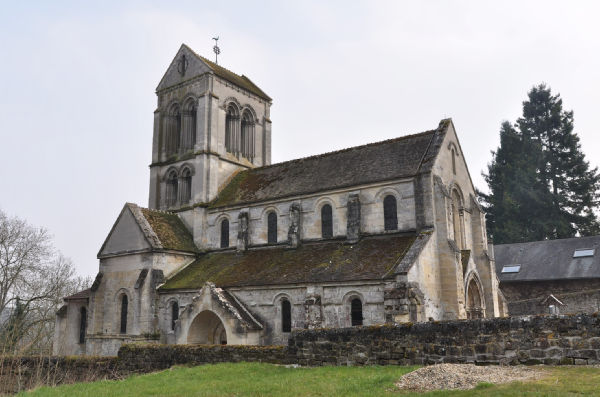
- The church of Lierval
- Location of Lierval
- Location within France Location within Hauts-de-France
- Coordinates: 49°29′05″N 3°37′03″E
- Country: France
- Region: Hauts-de-France
- Department: Aisne
- Arrondissement: Laon
- Canton: Laon-2
- Intercommunality: CA Pays de Laon

Government
  - Mayor (2026–32): Jacques Lecomte
- Area^{1}: 3.77 km^{2} (1.46 sq mi)
- Elevation: 90 m (300 ft)
- Highest elevation: 190 m (620 ft)
- Lowest elevation: 90 m (300 ft)
- Population (2023): 117
  - Density: 31.0/km^{2} (80.4/sq mi)
- Time zone: UTC+01:00 (CET)
  - Summer (DST): UTC+02:00 (CEST)
- INSEE/Postal code: 02429 /02860
- ^{1} French Land Register data, which excludes lakes, ponds, glaciers > 1 km^{2} (0.386 sq mi or 247 acres) and river estuaries.

Lierval (French pronunciation: [ljɛʁval]) is a commune in the Aisne department in Hauts-de-France in northern France.

== Population ==
Historical population
Year	Pop.	±% p.a.
1968	85	—
1975	75	−1.77%
1982	94	+3.28%
1990	107	+1.63%
1999	132	+2.36%
2007	119	−1.29%
2012	113	−1.03%
2017	118	+0.87%
2023	117	−0.14%
Source: INSEE

== See also ==
- Communes of the Aisne department
