= Veslud =

- Commune
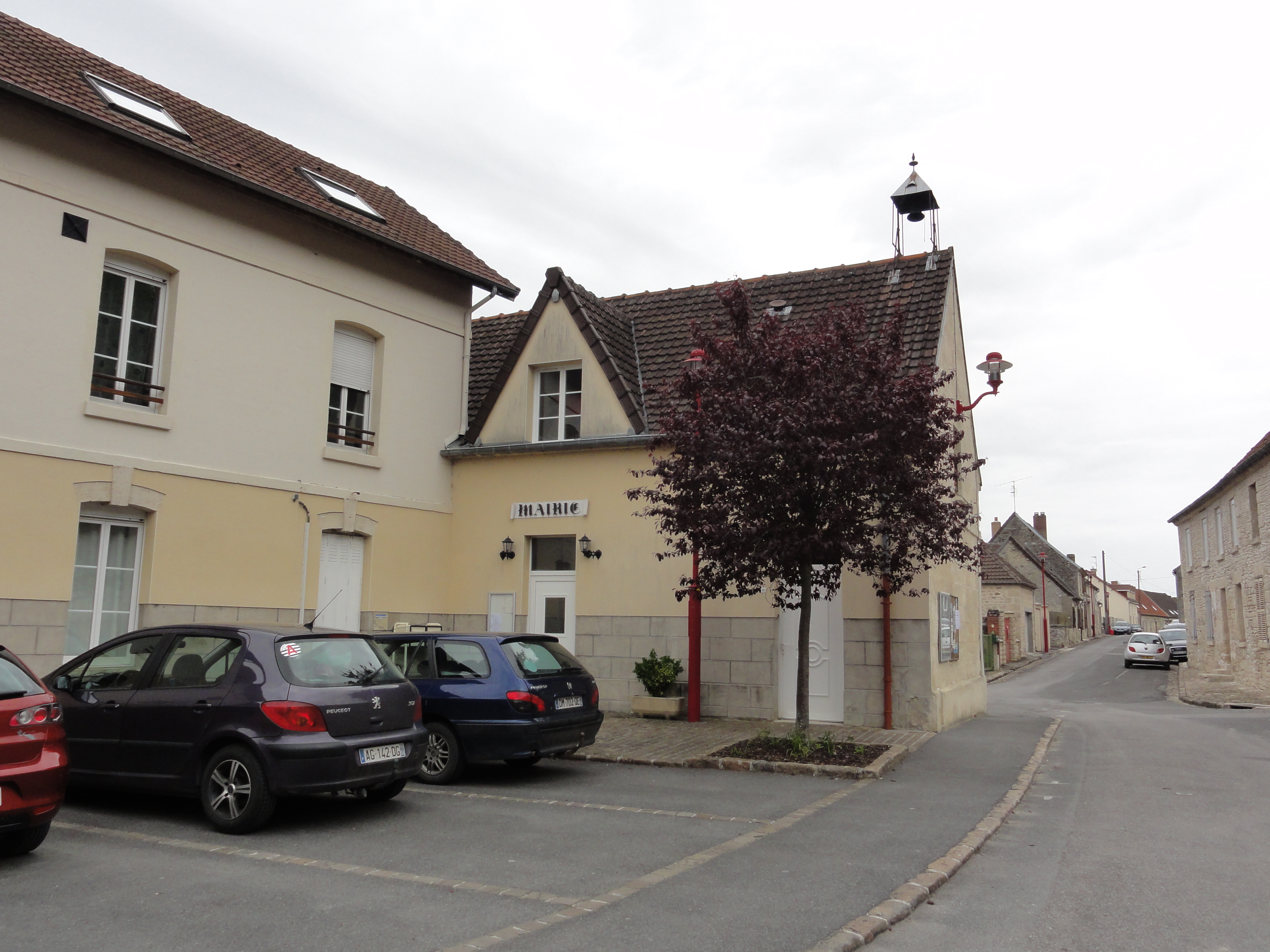
- The town hall of Veslud
- Location of Veslud
- Location within France Location within Hauts-de-France
- Coordinates: 49°32′03″N 3°44′00″E
- Country: France
- Region: Hauts-de-France
- Department: Aisne
- Arrondissement: Laon
- Canton: Laon-2
- Intercommunality: CA Pays de Laon

Government
  - Mayor (2026–32): Séverine Duriez-Fremaux
- Area^{1}: 4.13 km^{2} (1.59 sq mi)
- Elevation: 103 m (338 ft)
- Highest elevation: 187 m (614 ft)
- Lowest elevation: 74 m (243 ft)
- Population (2023): 270
  - Density: 65/km^{2} (170/sq mi)
- Time zone: UTC+01:00 (CET)
  - Summer (DST): UTC+02:00 (CEST)
- INSEE/Postal code: 02791 /02840
- ^{1} French Land Register data, which excludes lakes, ponds, glaciers > 1 km^{2} (0.386 sq mi or 247 acres) and river estuaries.

Veslud is a commune in the Aisne department in Hauts-de-France in northern France.

== Population ==
Historical population
Year	Pop.	±% p.a.
1968	252	—
1975	213	−2.37%
1982	247	+2.14%
1990	222	−1.33%
1999	252	+1.42%
2007	248	−0.20%
2012	253	+0.40%
2017	242	−0.89%
2023	270	+1.84%
Source: INSEE

== See also ==
- Communes of the Aisne department
