= Nouvion-le-Vineux =

- Commune
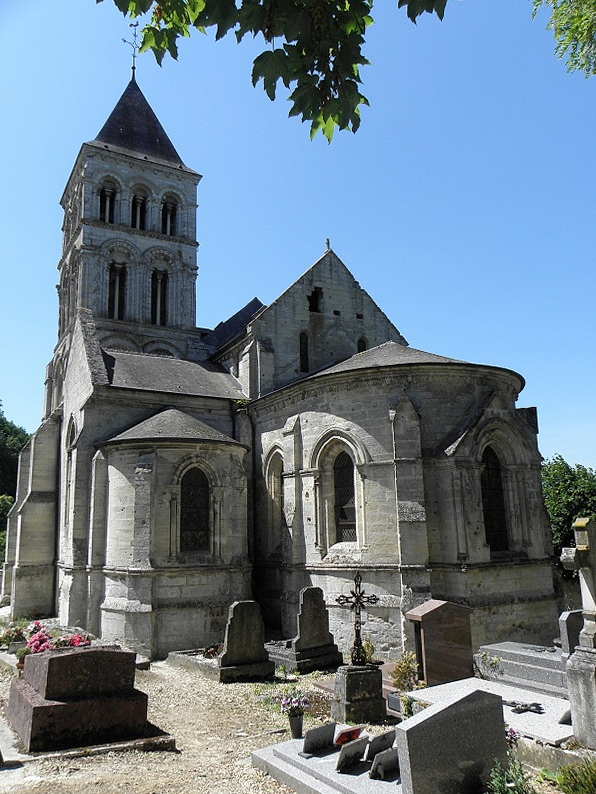
- The church of Nouvion-le-Vineux
- Location of Nouvion-le-Vineux
- Location within France Location within Hauts-de-France
- Coordinates: 49°30′13″N 3°36′43″E
- Country: France
- Region: Hauts-de-France
- Department: Aisne
- Arrondissement: Laon
- Canton: Laon-2
- Intercommunality: CA Pays de Laon

Government
  - Mayor (2026–32): Philippe Pire
- Area^{1}: 3.53 km^{2} (1.36 sq mi)
- Elevation: 90 m (300 ft)
- Highest elevation: 184 m (604 ft)
- Lowest elevation: 61 m (200 ft)
- Population (2023): 143
  - Density: 40.5/km^{2} (105/sq mi)
- Time zone: UTC+01:00 (CET)
  - Summer (DST): UTC+02:00 (CEST)
- INSEE/Postal code: 02561 /02860
- ^{1} French Land Register data, which excludes lakes, ponds, glaciers > 1 km^{2} (0.386 sq mi or 247 acres) and river estuaries.

Nouvion-le-Vineux (French pronunciation: [nuvjɔ̃ lə vinø]) is a commune in the Aisne department in Hauts-de-France in northern France.

== Population ==
Historical population
Year	Pop.	±% p.a.
1968	103	—
1975	123	+2.57%
1982	162	+4.01%
1990	188	+1.88%
1999	169	−1.18%
2007	164	−0.37%
2012	155	−1.12%
2017	165	+1.26%
2023	143	−2.36%
Source: INSEE

== See also ==
- Communes of the Aisne department
