= Bruyères-et-Montbérault =

- Commune
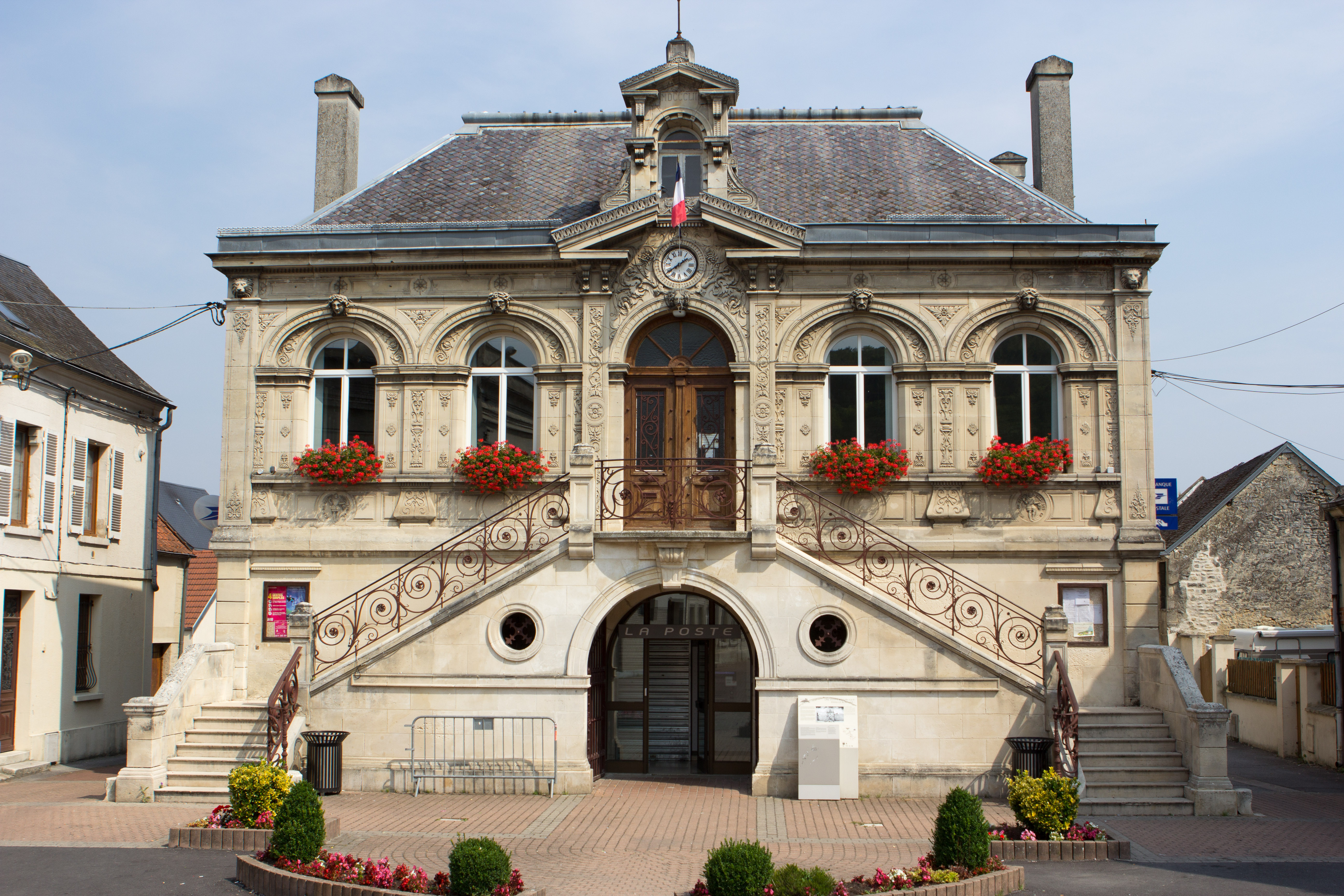
- The town hall of Bruyères-et-Montbérault
- Location of Bruyères-et-Montbérault
- Location within France Location within Hauts-de-France
- Coordinates: 49°31′31″N 3°39′51″E
- Country: France
- Region: Hauts-de-France
- Department: Aisne
- Arrondissement: Laon
- Canton: Laon-2
- Intercommunality: CA Pays de Laon

Government
  - Mayor (2026–32): Hervé Moncourtois
- Area^{1}: 11.61 km^{2} (4.48 sq mi)
- Elevation: 86 m (282 ft)
- Highest elevation: 199 m (653 ft)
- Lowest elevation: 67 m (220 ft)
- Population (2023): 1,411
  - Density: 121.5/km^{2} (314.8/sq mi)
- Time zone: UTC+01:00 (CET)
  - Summer (DST): UTC+02:00 (CEST)
- INSEE/Postal code: 02128 /02860
- ^{1} French Land Register data, which excludes lakes, ponds, glaciers > 1 km^{2} (0.386 sq mi or 247 acres) and river estuaries.

Bruyères-et-Montbérault (French pronunciation: [bʁɥijɛʁ e mɔ̃beʁo]) is a commune in the department of Aisne in Hauts-de-France in northern France.

== Population ==
Historical population
Year	Pop.	±% p.a.
1968	1,073	—
1975	1,108	+0.46%
1982	1,269	+1.96%
1990	1,410	+1.33%
1999	1,512	+0.78%
2007	1,591	+0.64%
2012	1,570	−0.27%
2017	1,532	−0.49%
2023	1,411	−1.36%
Source: INSEE

== See also ==
- Communes of the Aisne department
