= Ployart-et-Vaurseine =

- Commune
- Tower of Vaurseine
- Location of Ployart-et-Vaurseine
- Location within France Location within Hauts-de-France
- Coordinates: 49°29′21″N 3°44′43″E
- Country: France
- Region: Hauts-de-France
- Department: Aisne
- Arrondissement: Laon
- Canton: Villeneuve-sur-Aisne
- Intercommunality: Chemin des Dames

Government
  - Mayor (2026–32): François Harant
- Area^{1}: 4.93 km^{2} (1.90 sq mi)
- Elevation: 120 m (390 ft)
- Highest elevation: 195 m (640 ft)
- Lowest elevation: 88 m (289 ft)
- Population (2023): 24
  - Density: 4.9/km^{2} (13/sq mi)
- Time zone: UTC+01:00 (CET)
  - Summer (DST): UTC+02:00 (CEST)
- INSEE/Postal code: 02609 /02860
- ^{1} French Land Register data, which excludes lakes, ponds, glaciers > 1 km^{2} (0.386 sq mi or 247 acres) and river estuaries.

Ployart-et-Vaurseine is a commune in the Aisne department in Hauts-de-France in northern France.

== Population ==
Historical population
Year	Pop.	±% p.a.
1968	39	—
1975	26	−5.63%
1982	26	+0.00%
1990	18	−4.49%
1999	27	+4.61%
2007	18	−4.94%
2012	22	+4.10%
2017	21	−0.93%
2023	24	+2.25%
Source: INSEE

With a population of only 24 in 2023, Ployart-et-Vaurseine is the 3rd least populated commune in the department of Aisne.

== Tower of Vaurseine ==
Within the commune is a medieval tower, built circa 1400.

== See also ==
- Communes of the Aisne department
