= Parfondru =

- Commune
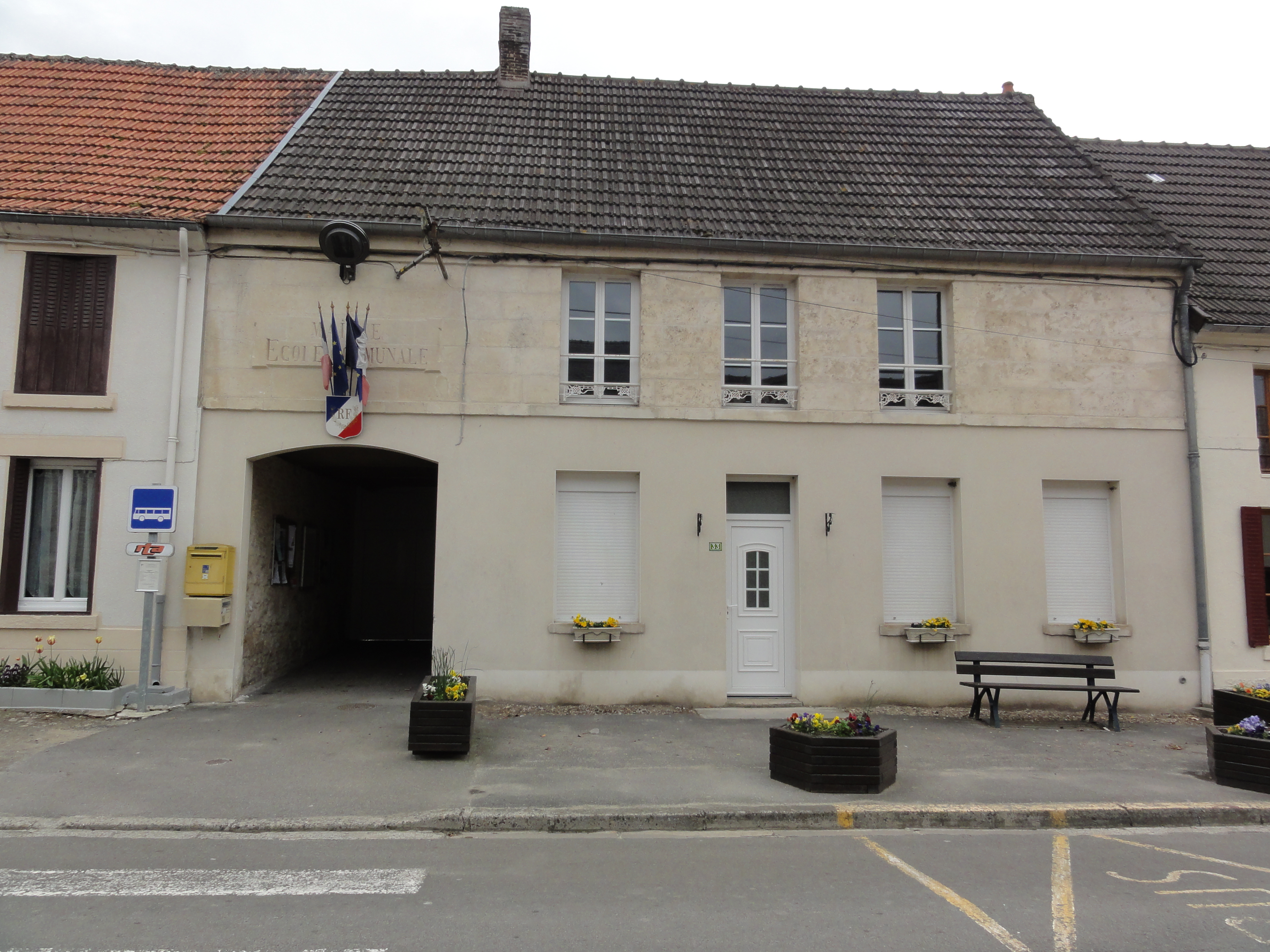
- The town hall and school of Parfondru
- Location of Parfondru
- Location within France Location within Hauts-de-France
- Coordinates: 49°31′42″N 3°42′41″E
- Country: France
- Region: Hauts-de-France
- Department: Aisne
- Arrondissement: Laon
- Canton: Laon-2
- Intercommunality: CA Pays de Laon

Government
  - Mayor (2026–32): Jean-Luc Liénard
- Area^{1}: 9.08 km^{2} (3.51 sq mi)
- Elevation: 80 m (260 ft)
- Highest elevation: 189 m (620 ft)
- Lowest elevation: 69 m (226 ft)
- Population (2023): 353
  - Density: 38.9/km^{2} (101/sq mi)
- Time zone: UTC+01:00 (CET)
  - Summer (DST): UTC+02:00 (CEST)
- INSEE/Postal code: 02587 /02840
- ^{1} French Land Register data, which excludes lakes, ponds, glaciers > 1 km^{2} (0.386 sq mi or 247 acres) and river estuaries.

Parfondru (French pronunciation: [paʁfɔ̃dʁy]) is a commune in the Aisne department in Hauts-de-France region in northern France.

== Population ==
Historical population
Year	Pop.	±% p.a.
1968	234	—
1975	211	−1.47%
1982	269	+3.53%
1990	303	+1.50%
1999	295	−0.30%
2007	347	+2.05%
2012	352	+0.29%
2017	352	+0.00%
2023	353	+0.05%
Source: INSEE

== Urbanism ==
=== Typology ===
As of 1 January 2024, Parfondru is categorised as a rural municipality with dispersed housing, according to the new 7-level municipal density grid defined by the National Institute of Statistics and Economic Studies in 2022. It is located outside an urban area. Furthermore, the commune is part of the Laon attraction area, of which it is a suburb village. This area, which includes 106 municipalities, is categorised in areas with 50'000 to less than 200'000 inhabitants.

=== Land use ===
The land use of the municipality, as shown by the European database of biophysical land use Corine Land Cover (CLC), is marked by the extent of forests and semi-natural environments (58.5% in 2018), an increase compared to 1990 (57.1%). In 2018, the exact land use was: forests (58.5%), arable land (24.8%), meadows (6.4%), heterogeneous agricultural areas (5.7%), urbanized areas (4.6%).

The land use evolution of the municipality and of its infrastructure can be observed on the different cartographic representations of the territory: the Cassini map (18th century), the general staff map (1820–1866) and the IGN maps or aerial photos for the current period (1950 to today).

== See also ==
- Communes of the Aisne department
