= Eppes, Aisne =

Eppes
- Commune
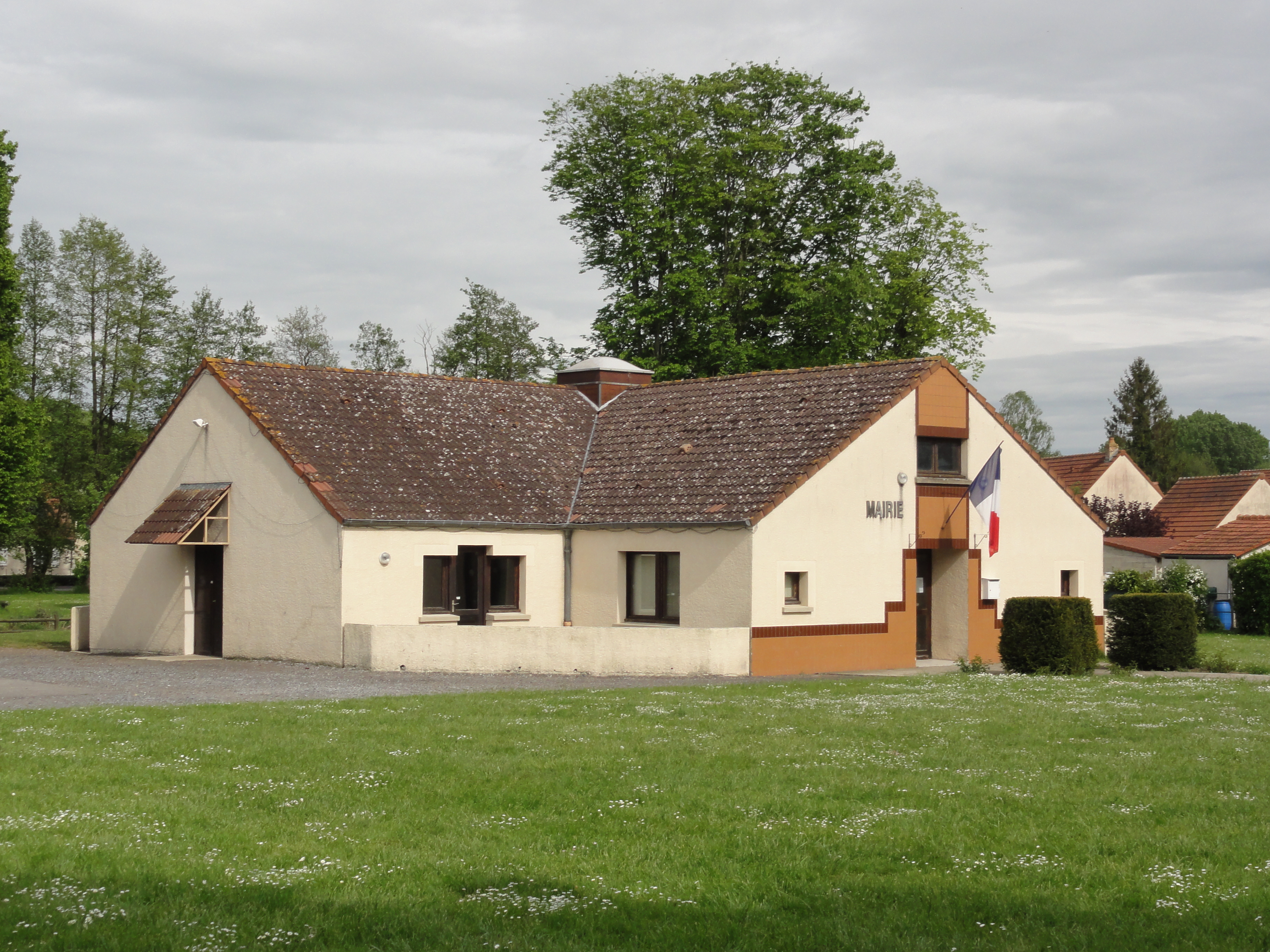
- The town hall of Eppes

- Coat of arms
- Location of Eppes
- Location within France Location within Hauts-de-France
- Coordinates: 49°33′28″N 3°44′18″E
- Country: France
- Region: Hauts-de-France
- Department: Aisne
- Arrondissement: Laon
- Canton: Laon-2
- Intercommunality: CA Pays de Laon

Government
  - Mayor (2026–32): Robert Amy
- Area^{1}: 7.71 km^{2} (2.98 sq mi)
- Elevation: 78 m (256 ft)
- Highest elevation: 198 m (650 ft)
- Lowest elevation: 72 m (236 ft)
- Population (2023): 438
  - Density: 56.8/km^{2} (147/sq mi)
- Time zone: UTC+01:00 (CET)
  - Summer (DST): UTC+02:00 (CEST)
- INSEE/Postal code: 02282 /02840
- ^{1} French Land Register data, which excludes lakes, ponds, glaciers > 1 km^{2} (0.386 sq mi or 247 acres) and river estuaries.

Eppes (French pronunciation: [ɛp]) is a commune in the Aisne department in Hauts-de-France in northern France.

== Population ==
Historical population
Year	Pop.	±% p.a.
1968	289	—
1975	290	+0.05%
1982	373	+3.66%
1990	359	−0.48%
1999	349	−0.31%
2007	376	+0.94%
2012	412	+1.85%
2017	417	+0.24%
2023	438	+0.82%
Source: INSEE

== See also ==
- Communes of the Aisne department
