= Colligis-Crandelain =

- Commune
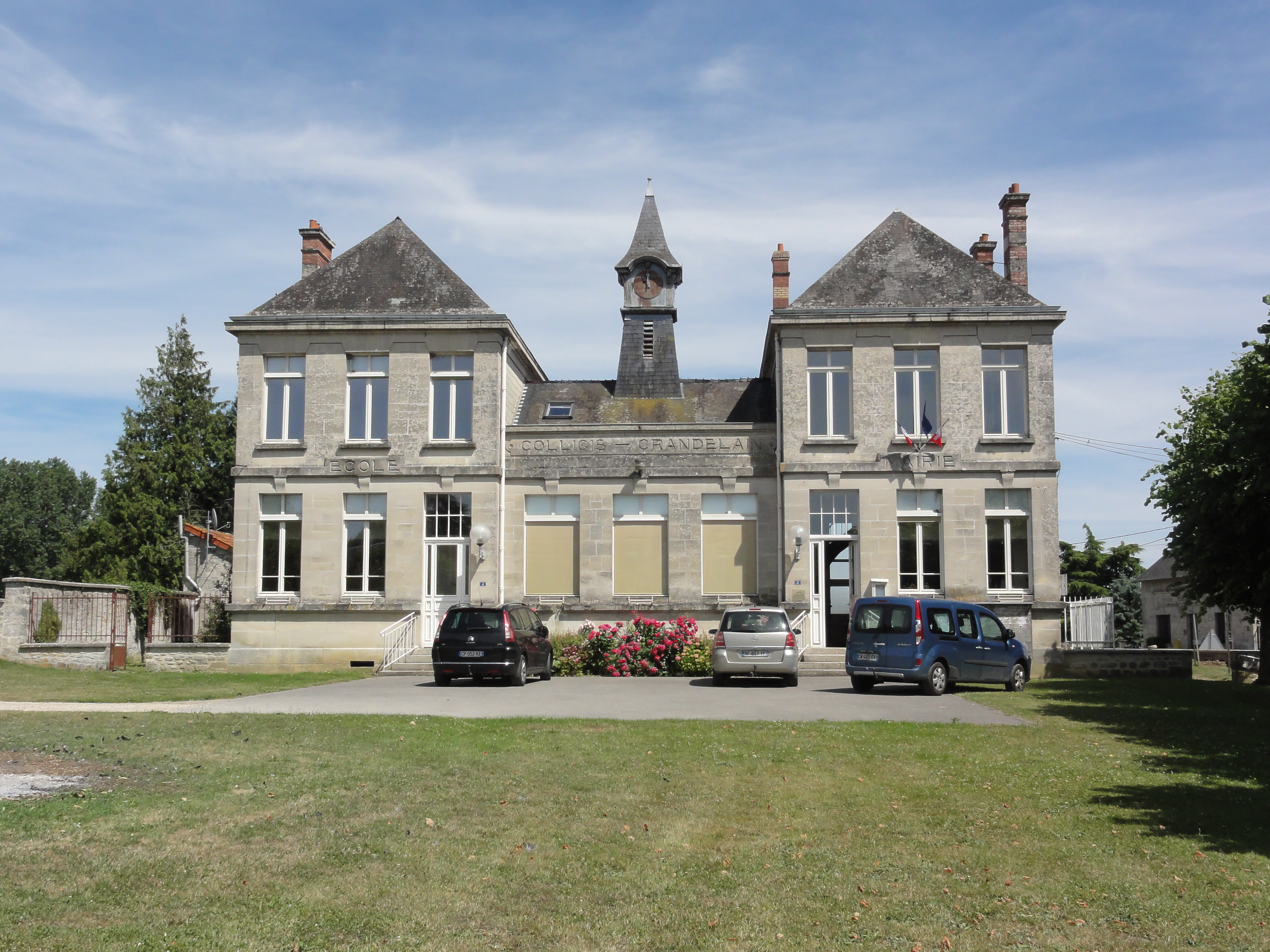
- The town hall of Colligis

- Coat of arms
- Location of Colligis-Crandelain
- Location within France Location within Hauts-de-France
- Coordinates: 49°28′36″N 3°38′28″E
- Country: France
- Region: Hauts-de-France
- Department: Aisne
- Arrondissement: Laon
- Canton: Laon-2
- Intercommunality: CA Pays de Laon

Government
  - Mayor (2026–32): Iseult d'Hautefeuille
- Area^{1}: 6.53 km^{2} (2.52 sq mi)
- Elevation: 88 m (289 ft)
- Highest elevation: 194 m (636 ft)
- Lowest elevation: 68 m (223 ft)
- Population (2023): 207
  - Density: 31.7/km^{2} (82.1/sq mi)
- Time zone: UTC+01:00 (CET)
  - Summer (DST): UTC+02:00 (CEST)
- INSEE/Postal code: 02205 /02860
- ^{1} French Land Register data, which excludes lakes, ponds, glaciers > 1 km^{2} (0.386 sq mi or 247 acres) and river estuaries.

Colligis-Crandelain is a commune in the Aisne department in Hauts-de-France in northern France.

== Geography ==
The river Ailette flows west through the commune.

== Population ==
Historical population
Year	Pop.	±% p.a.
1968	133	—
1975	144	+1.14%
1982	145	+0.10%
1990	152	+0.59%
1999	145	−0.52%
2007	151	+0.51%
2012	185	+4.15%
2017	248	+6.04%
2023	207	−2.97%
Source: INSEE

== See also ==
- Communes of the Aisne department
