= Étouvelles =

- Commune
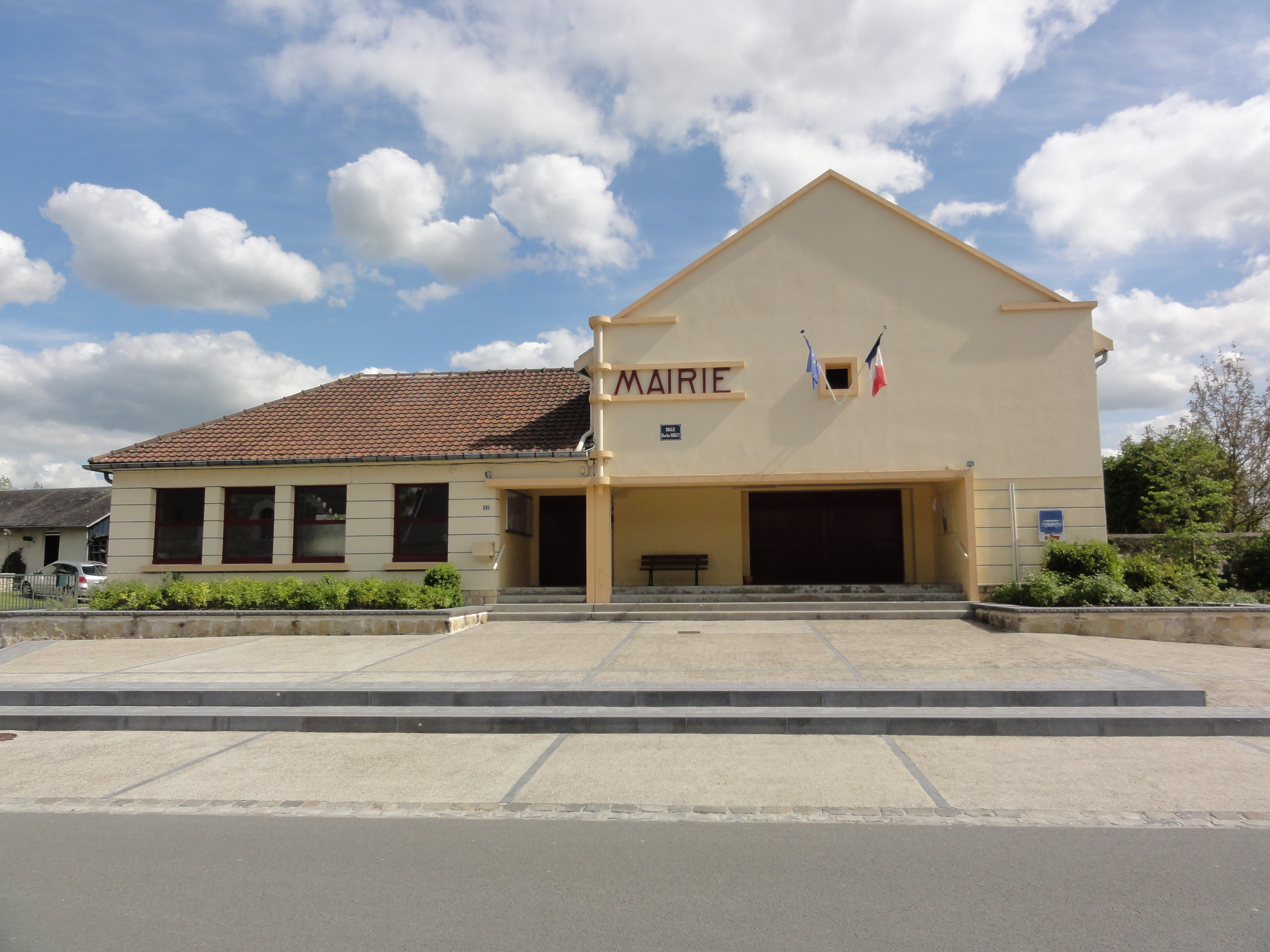
- The town hall of Étouvelles

- Coat of arms
- Location of Étouvelles
- Location within France Location within Hauts-de-France
- Coordinates: 49°31′16″N 3°34′56″E
- Country: France
- Region: Hauts-de-France
- Department: Aisne
- Arrondissement: Laon
- Canton: Laon-2
- Intercommunality: CA Pays de Laon

Government
  - Mayor (2026–32): Mohammed Ezzel
- Area^{1}: 2.38 km^{2} (0.92 sq mi)
- Elevation: 66 m (217 ft)
- Highest elevation: 67 m (220 ft)
- Lowest elevation: 59 m (194 ft)
- Population (2023): 208
  - Density: 87.4/km^{2} (226/sq mi)
- Time zone: UTC+01:00 (CET)
  - Summer (DST): UTC+02:00 (CEST)
- INSEE/Postal code: 02294 /02000
- ^{1} French Land Register data, which excludes lakes, ponds, glaciers > 1 km^{2} (0.386 sq mi or 247 acres) and river estuaries.

Étouvelles (French pronunciation: [etuvɛl]) is a commune in the Aisne department in Hauts-de-France in northern France.

== Population ==
Historical population
Year	Pop.	±% p.a.
1968	145	—
1975	121	−2.55%
1982	172	+5.15%
1990	207	+2.34%
1999	199	−0.44%
2007	208	+0.55%
2012	219	+1.04%
2017	213	−0.55%
2023	208	−0.40%
Source: INSEE

== See also ==
- Communes of the Aisne department
