= Canton of Sissonne =

Coordinates: 49°34′20″N 3°53′30″E

Sissonne
- Former canton
- Interactive map of Sissonne
- Country: France
- Region: Hauts-de-France
- Department: Aisne
- No. of communes: {{{nbcomm}}}
- Disbanded: 2015
- Area: 302.74 km^{2} (116.89 sq mi)
- Population (2012): 10,657
  - Density: 35.202/km^{2} (91.172/sq mi)

The canton of Sissonne is a former administrative division in northern France. It was disbanded following the French canton reorganisation which came into effect in March 2015. It consisted of 20 communes, which joined the new canton of Villeneuve-sur-Aisne in 2015. It had 10,657 inhabitants (2012).

The canton comprised the following communes:

- Boncourt
- Bucy-lès-Pierrepont
- Chivres-en-Laonnois
- Coucy-lès-Eppes
- Courtrizy-et-Fussigny
- Ébouleau
- Gizy
- Goudelancourt-lès-Pierrepont
- Lappion
- Liesse-Notre-Dame
- Mâchecourt
- Marchais
- Mauregny-en-Haye
- Missy-lès-Pierrepont
- Montaigu
- Nizy-le-Comte
- Saint-Erme-Outre-et-Ramecourt
- Sainte-Preuve
- La Selve
- Sissonne

== Demographics ==
Historical population Canton of Sissonne
| Year | 1962 | 1968 | 1975 | 1982 | 1990 | 1999 |
| Pop. | 10,160 | 10,859 | 10,310 | 10,669 | 10,628 | 10,479 |
| ±% | — | +6.9% | −5.1% | +3.5% | −0.4% | −1.4% |
From the year 1962 on: No double counting – residents of multiple communes (e.g. students and military personnel) are counted only once. Source: INSEE

== See also ==
- Cantons of the Aisne department
