= Goudelancourt =

Goudelancourt may refer to several communes in France:

- Goudelancourt-lès-Berrieux, in the Aisne department
- Goudelancourt-lès-Pierrepont, in the Aisne department
