= Cuiry-lès-Chaudardes =

- Commune
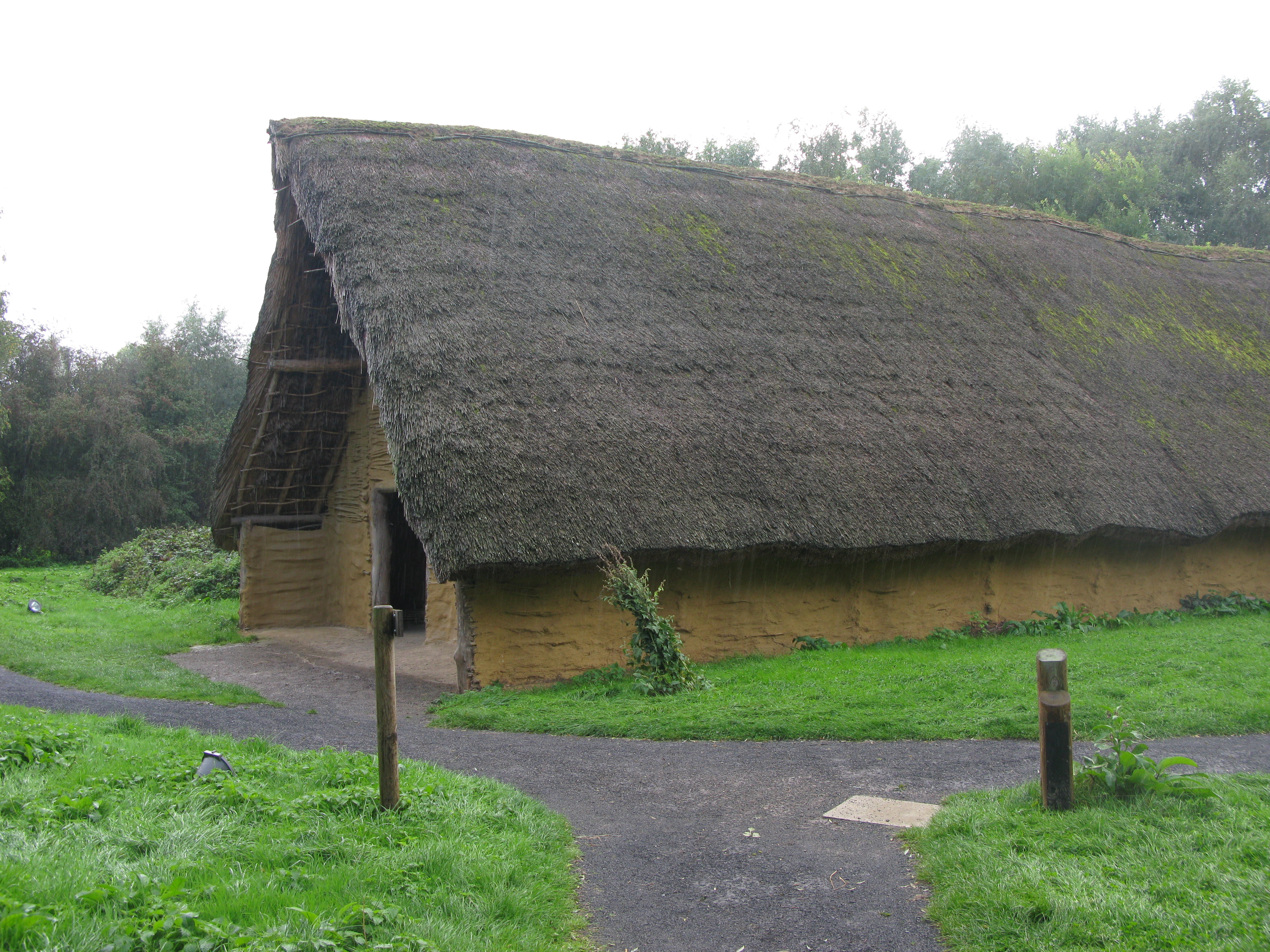
- Reconstructed neolithic house
- Location of Cuiry-lès-Chaudardes
- Location within France Location within Hauts-de-France
- Coordinates: 49°23′13″N 3°46′14″E
- Country: France
- Region: Hauts-de-France
- Department: Aisne
- Arrondissement: Laon
- Canton: Villeneuve-sur-Aisne
- Intercommunality: Chemin des Dames

Government
  - Mayor (2026–32): Tony Bridier
- Area^{1}: 5.15 km^{2} (1.99 sq mi)
- Elevation: 50 m (160 ft)
- Highest elevation: 160 m (520 ft)
- Lowest elevation: 46 m (151 ft)
- Population (2023): 84
  - Density: 16/km^{2} (42/sq mi)
- Time zone: UTC+01:00 (CET)
  - Summer (DST): UTC+02:00 (CEST)
- INSEE/Postal code: 02250 /02160
- ^{1} French Land Register data, which excludes lakes, ponds, glaciers > 1 km^{2} (0.386 sq mi or 247 acres) and river estuaries.

Cuiry-lès-Chaudardes (French pronunciation: [kɥiʁi lɛ ʃodaʁd], literally Cuiry near Chaudardes) is a commune in the Aisne department in Hauts-de-France in northern France.

== Population ==
Historical population
Year	Pop.	±% p.a.
1968	41	—
1975	28	−5.30%
1982	26	−1.05%
1990	35	+3.79%
1999	42	+2.05%
2007	82	+8.72%
2012	75	−1.77%
2017	76	+0.27%
2023	84	+1.68%
Source: INSEE

== See also ==
- Communes of the Aisne department
