= Œuilly, Aisne =

Œuilly
- Commune
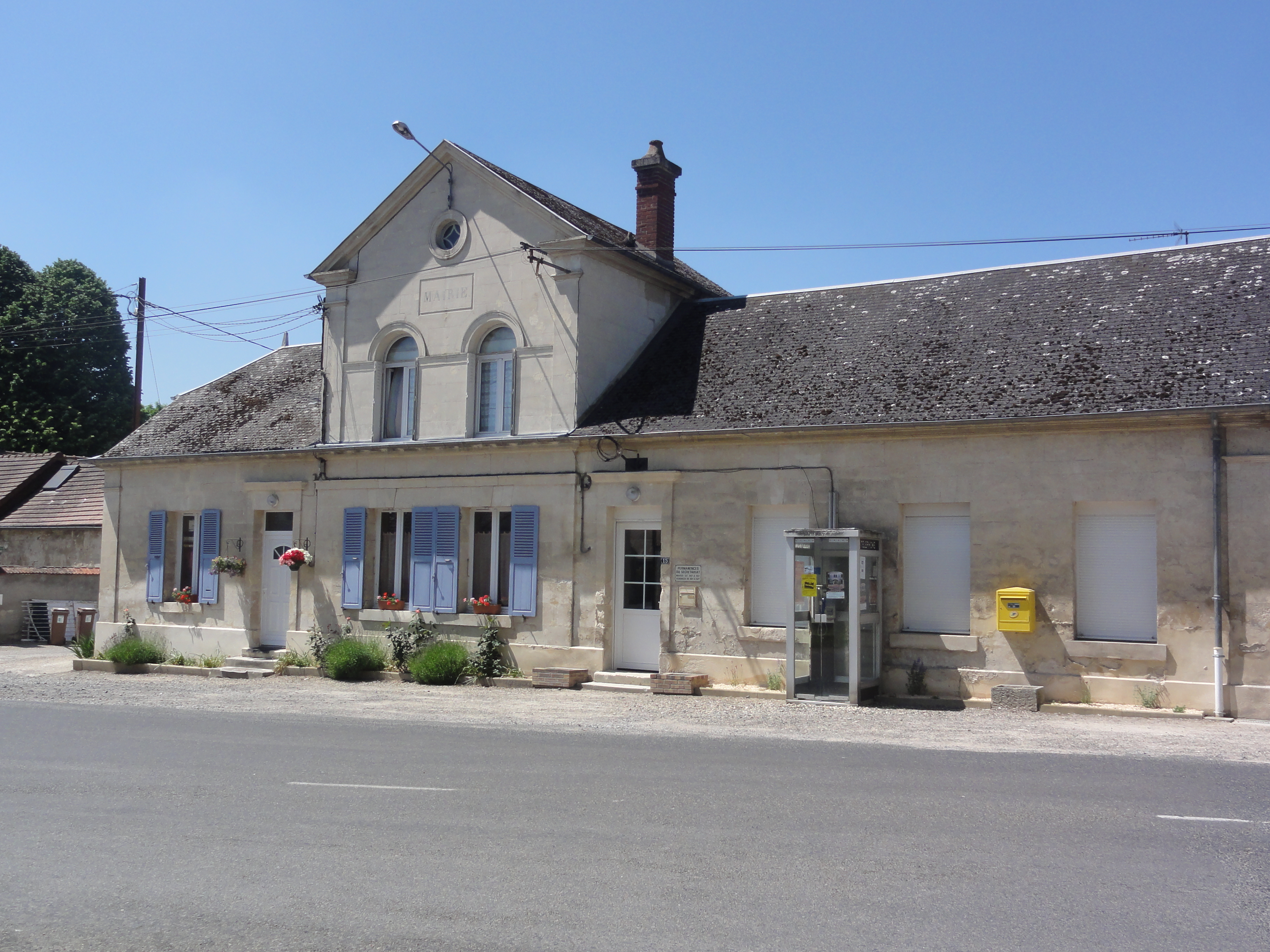
- Town hall
- Location of Œuilly
- Location within France Location within Hauts-de-France
- Coordinates: 49°23′27″N 3°41′20″E
- Country: France
- Region: Hauts-de-France
- Department: Aisne
- Arrondissement: Laon
- Canton: Villeneuve-sur-Aisne
- Intercommunality: Chemin des Dames

Government
  - Mayor (2026–32): Catherine Losfeld
- Area^{1}: 2.86 km^{2} (1.10 sq mi)
- Elevation: 60 m (200 ft)
- Highest elevation: 151 m (495 ft)
- Lowest elevation: 44 m (144 ft)
- Population (2023): 293
  - Density: 102/km^{2} (265/sq mi)
- Time zone: UTC+01:00 (CET)
  - Summer (DST): UTC+02:00 (CEST)
- INSEE/Postal code: 02565 /02160
- ^{1} French Land Register data, which excludes lakes, ponds, glaciers > 1 km^{2} (0.386 sq mi or 247 acres) and river estuaries.

Œuilly (French pronunciation: [œji]) is a commune in the Aisne department in Hauts-de-France in northern France.

== Population ==
Historical population
Year	Pop.	±% p.a.
1968	191	—
1975	155	−2.94%
1982	191	+3.03%
1990	215	+1.49%
1999	228	+0.65%
2007	269	+2.09%
2012	280	+0.80%
2017	290	+0.70%
2023	293	+0.17%
Source: INSEE

== See also ==
- Communes of the Aisne department
