= Prouvais =

- Commune
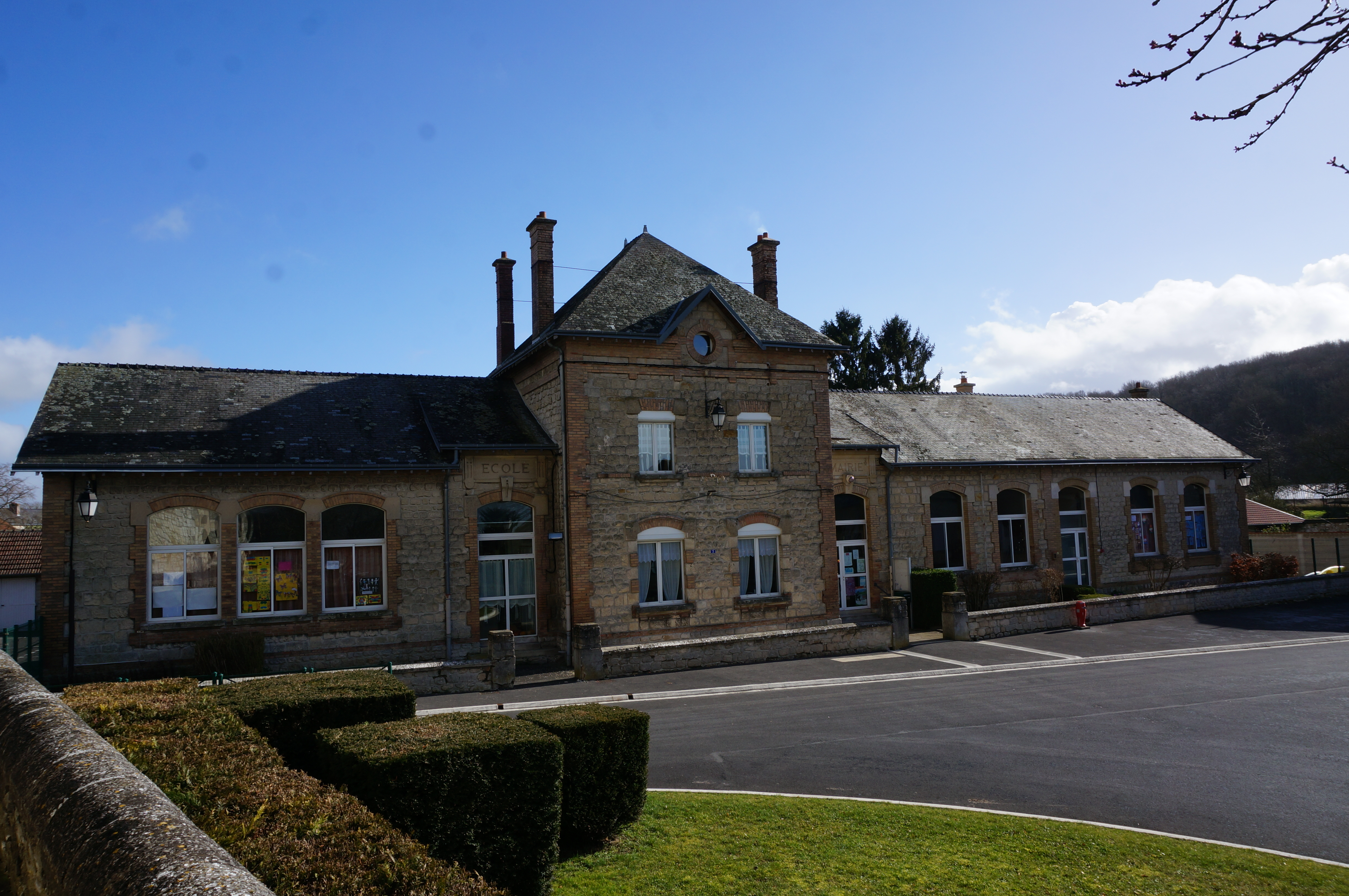
- The town hall and school of Prouvais
- Location of Prouvais
- Location within France Location within Hauts-de-France
- Coordinates: 49°27′52″N 3°58′32″E
- Country: France
- Region: Hauts-de-France
- Department: Aisne
- Arrondissement: Laon
- Canton: Villeneuve-sur-Aisne
- Intercommunality: Champagne Picarde

Government
  - Mayor (2026–32): Pierre-André Boulanger
- Area^{1}: 18.22 km^{2} (7.03 sq mi)
- Elevation: 120 m (390 ft)
- Highest elevation: 170 m (560 ft)
- Lowest elevation: 72 m (236 ft)
- Population (2023): 346
  - Density: 19.0/km^{2} (49.2/sq mi)
- Time zone: UTC+01:00 (CET)
  - Summer (DST): UTC+02:00 (CEST)
- INSEE/Postal code: 02626 /02190
- ^{1} French Land Register data, which excludes lakes, ponds, glaciers > 1 km^{2} (0.386 sq mi or 247 acres) and river estuaries.

Prouvais (French pronunciation: [pʁuvɛ]) is a commune in the Aisne department in Hauts-de-France in northern France.

== Population ==
Historical population
Year	Pop.	±% p.a.
1968	248	—
1975	245	−0.17%
1982	274	+1.61%
1990	438	+6.04%
1999	391	−1.25%
2007	379	−0.39%
2012	364	−0.80%
2017	319	−2.60%
2023	346	+1.36%
Source: INSEE

== See also ==
- Communes of the Aisne department
