= Jumigny =

- Commune
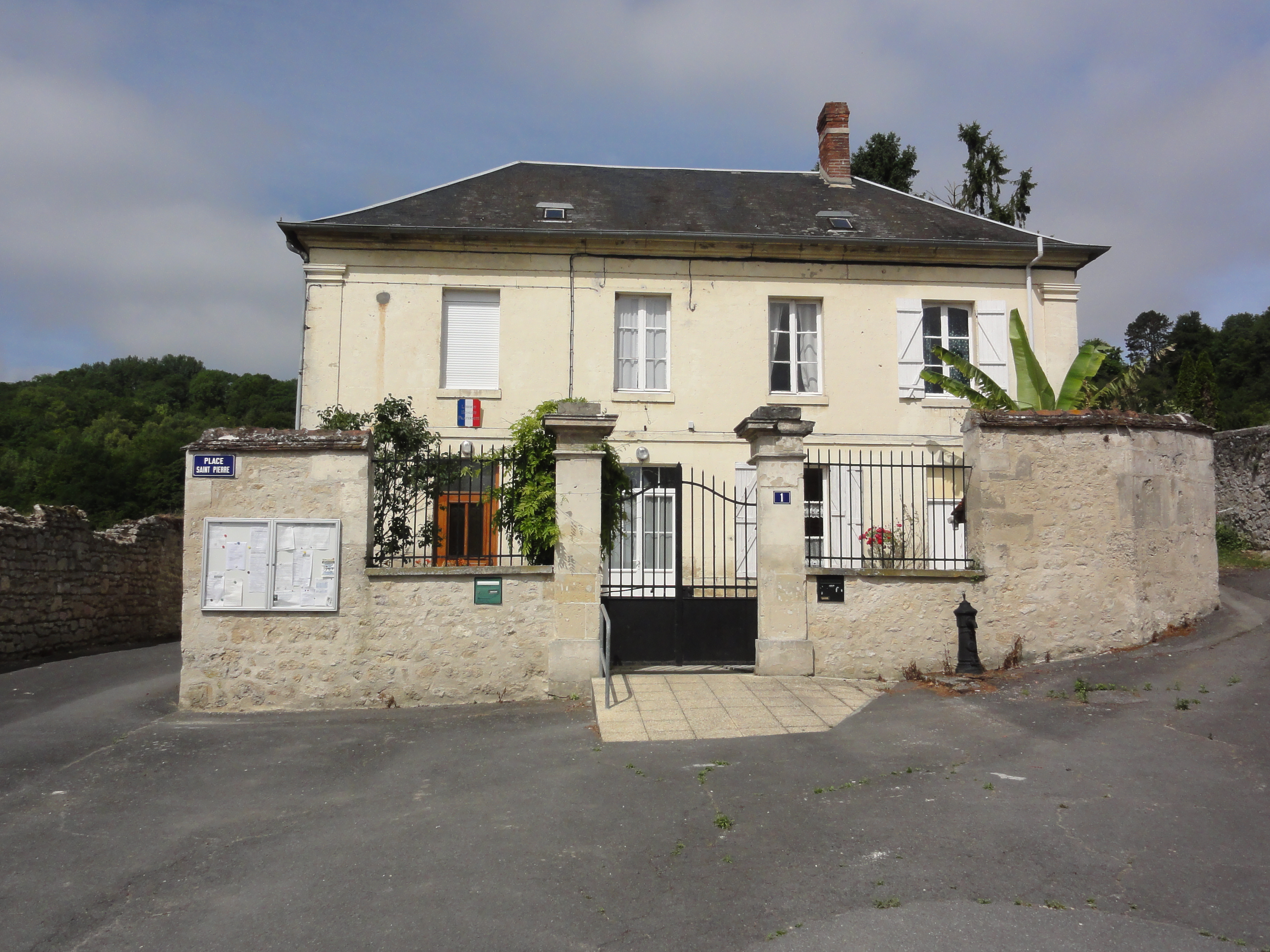
- The town hall of Jumigny
- Location of Jumigny
- Location within France Location within Hauts-de-France
- Coordinates: 49°24′44″N 3°43′05″E
- Country: France
- Region: Hauts-de-France
- Department: Aisne
- Arrondissement: Laon
- Canton: Villeneuve-sur-Aisne
- Intercommunality: Chemin des Dames

Government
  - Mayor (2026–32): Matthias Carpentier
- Area^{1}: 2.49 km^{2} (0.96 sq mi)
- Elevation: 90 m (300 ft)
- Highest elevation: 173 m (568 ft)
- Lowest elevation: 55 m (180 ft)
- Population (2023): 60
  - Density: 24/km^{2} (62/sq mi)
- Time zone: UTC+01:00 (CET)
  - Summer (DST): UTC+02:00 (CEST)
- INSEE/Postal code: 02396 /02160
- ^{1} French Land Register data, which excludes lakes, ponds, glaciers > 1 km^{2} (0.386 sq mi or 247 acres) and river estuaries.

Jumigny (French pronunciation: [ʒymiɲi]) is a commune in the Aisne department and Hauts-de-France region of northern France.

== Population ==
Historical population
Year	Pop.	±% p.a.
1968	77	—
1975	71	−1.15%
1982	68	−0.61%
1990	60	−1.55%
1999	68	+1.40%
2007	70	+0.36%
2012	64	−1.78%
2017	64	+0.00%
2023	60	−1.07%
Source: INSEE

== See also ==
- Communes of the Aisne department
