= Pargnan =

- Commune
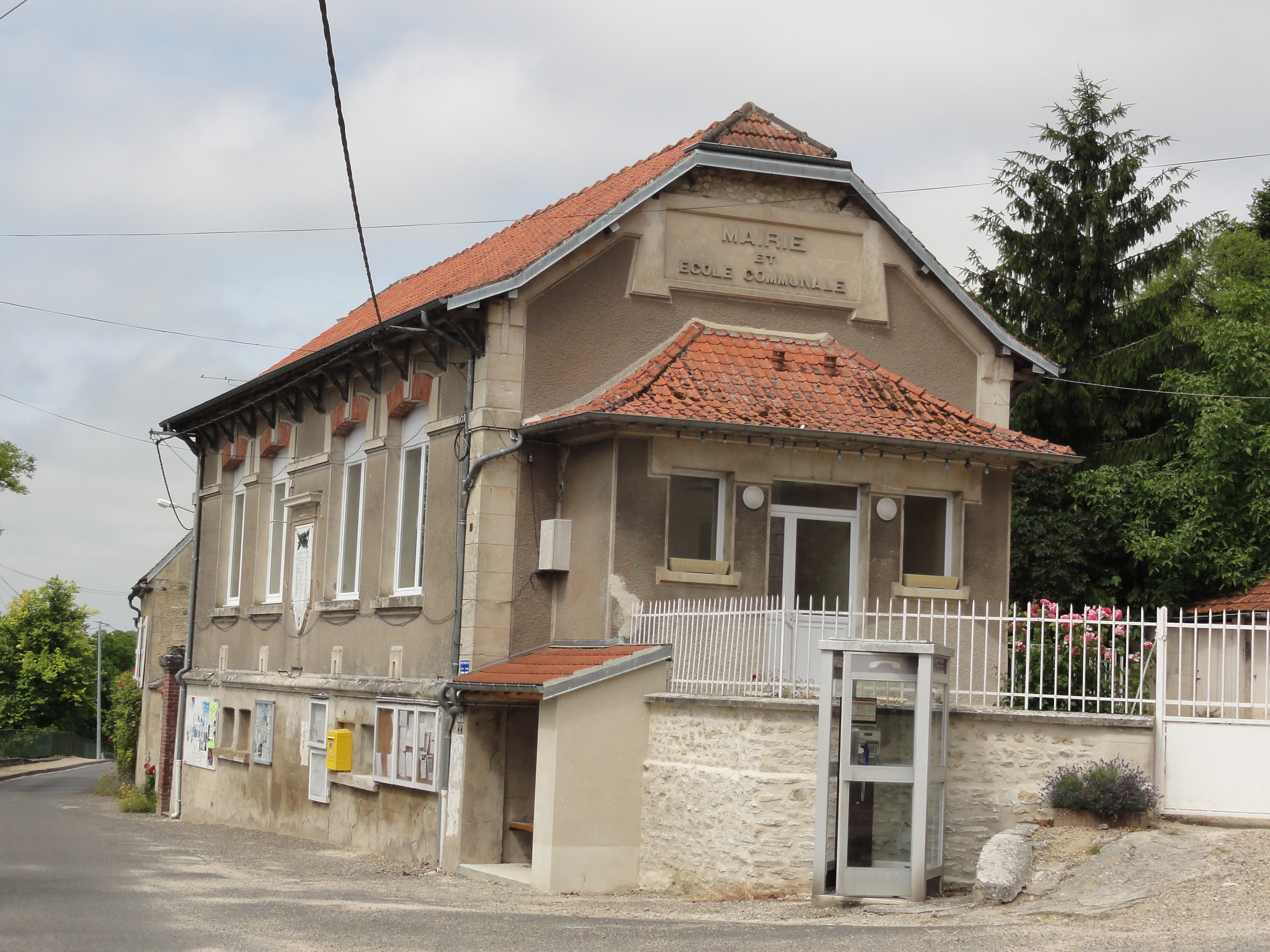
- The town hall and school of Pargnan
- Location of Pargnan
- Location within France Location within Hauts-de-France
- Coordinates: 49°24′05″N 3°41′35″E
- Country: France
- Region: Hauts-de-France
- Department: Aisne
- Arrondissement: Laon
- Canton: Villeneuve-sur-Aisne
- Intercommunality: Chemin des Dames

Government
  - Mayor (2026–32): Bertrand Caramelle
- Area^{1}: 2.39 km^{2} (0.92 sq mi)
- Elevation: 48 m (157 ft)
- Highest elevation: 181 m (594 ft)
- Lowest elevation: 46 m (151 ft)
- Population (2023): 66
  - Density: 28/km^{2} (72/sq mi)
- Time zone: UTC+01:00 (CET)
  - Summer (DST): UTC+02:00 (CEST)
- INSEE/Postal code: 02588 /02160
- ^{1} French Land Register data, which excludes lakes, ponds, glaciers > 1 km^{2} (0.386 sq mi or 247 acres) and river estuaries.

Pargnan (French pronunciation: [paʁɲɑ̃]) is a commune in the Aisne department in Hauts-de-France in northern France.

== Population ==
Historical population
Year	Pop.	±% p.a.
1968	57	—
1975	45	−3.32%
1982	47	+0.62%
1990	35	−3.62%
1999	39	+1.21%
2007	60	+5.53%
2012	66	+1.92%
2017	74	+2.31%
2023	66	−1.89%
Source: INSEE

== See also ==
- Communes of the Aisne department
