= Vassogne =

- Commune
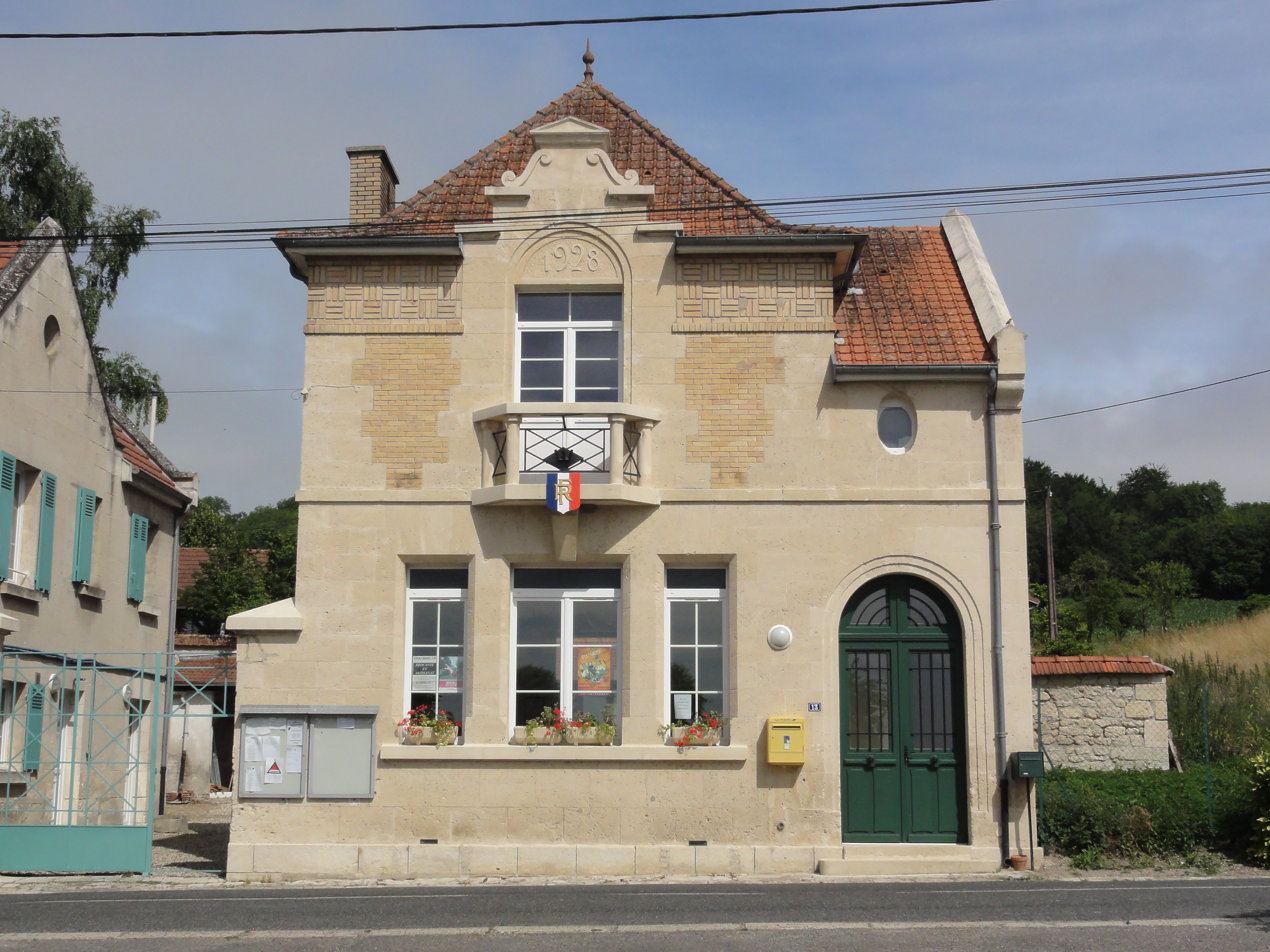
- The town hall of Vassogne
- Location of Vassogne
- Location within France Location within Hauts-de-France
- Coordinates: 49°25′21″N 3°43′46″E
- Country: France
- Region: Hauts-de-France
- Department: Aisne
- Arrondissement: Laon
- Canton: Villeneuve-sur-Aisne
- Intercommunality: Chemin des Dames

Government
  - Mayor (2026–32): Franck Villequey
- Area^{1}: 2.93 km^{2} (1.13 sq mi)
- Elevation: 58 m (190 ft)
- Highest elevation: 188 m (617 ft)
- Lowest elevation: 63 m (207 ft)
- Population (2023): 92
  - Density: 31/km^{2} (81/sq mi)
- Time zone: UTC+01:00 (CET)
  - Summer (DST): UTC+02:00 (CEST)
- INSEE/Postal code: 02764 /02160
- ^{1} French Land Register data, which excludes lakes, ponds, glaciers > 1 km^{2} (0.386 sq mi or 247 acres) and river estuaries.

Vassogne (French pronunciation: [vasɔɲ]) is a commune in the Aisne department in Hauts-de-France in northern France.

== Population ==
Historical population
Year	Pop.	±% p.a.
1968	82	—
1975	71	−2.04%
1982	47	−5.72%
1990	61	+3.31%
1999	50	−2.19%
2007	61	+2.52%
2012	71	+3.08%
2017	87	+4.15%
2023	92	+0.94%
Source: INSEE

== See also ==
- Communes of the Aisne department
