= Aizelles =

- Commune
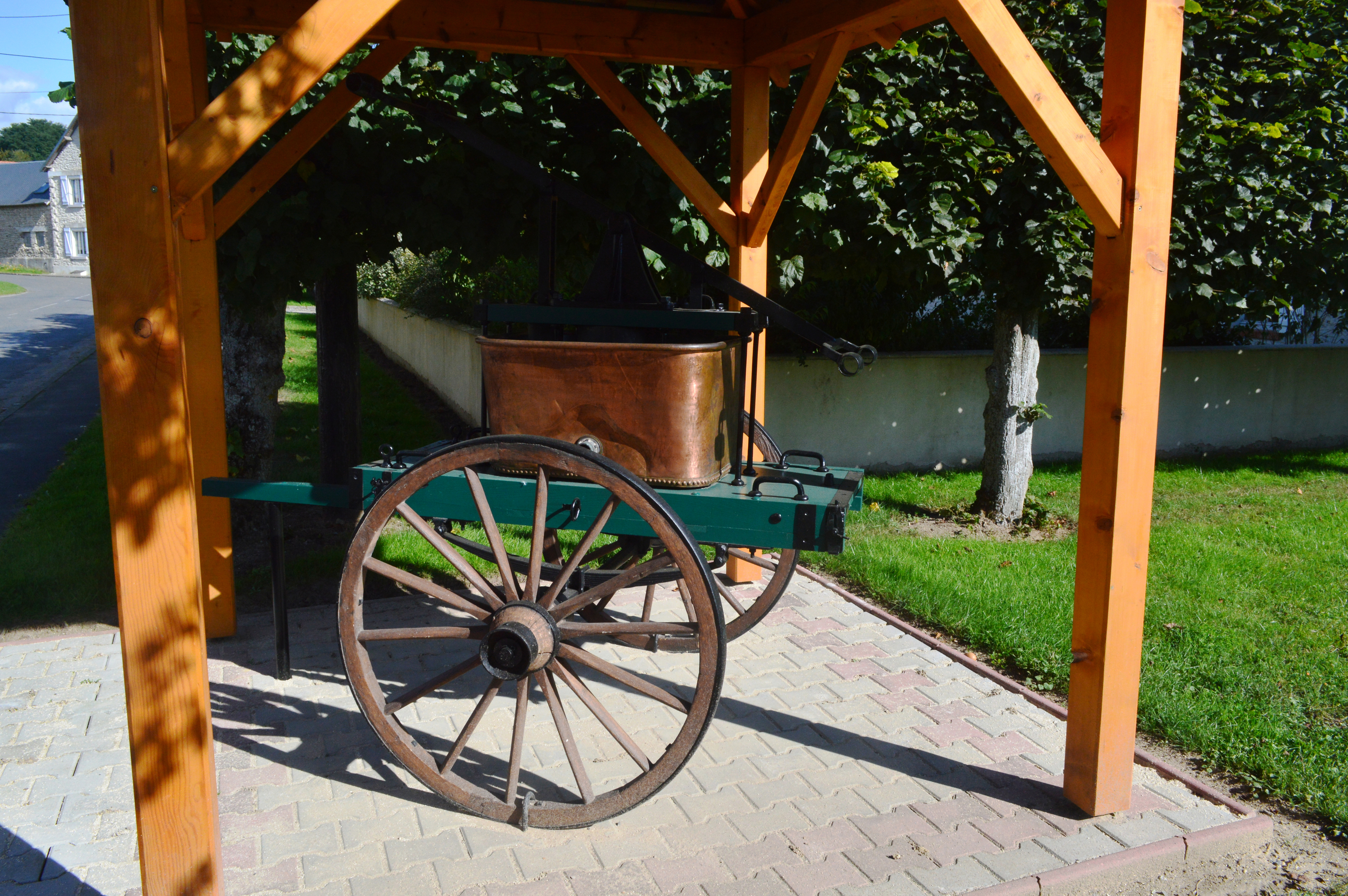
- Old fire-fighting pump
- Location of Aizelles
- Location within France Location within Hauts-de-France
- Coordinates: 49°29′26″N 3°48′44″E
- Country: France
- Region: Hauts-de-France
- Department: Aisne
- Arrondissement: Laon
- Canton: Villeneuve-sur-Aisne
- Intercommunality: Chemin des Dames

Government
  - Mayor (2026–32): Jean-Marie Merlo
- Area^{1}: 4.88 km^{2} (1.88 sq mi)
- Elevation: 75 m (246 ft)
- Highest elevation: 175 m (574 ft)
- Lowest elevation: 73 m (240 ft)
- Population (2023): 118
  - Density: 24.2/km^{2} (62.6/sq mi)
- Time zone: UTC+01:00 (CET)
  - Summer (DST): UTC+02:00 (CEST)
- INSEE/Postal code: 02007 /02820
- ^{1} French Land Register data, which excludes lakes, ponds, glaciers > 1 km^{2} (0.386 sq mi or 247 acres) and river estuaries.

Aizelles (French pronunciation: [ezɛl]) is a commune in the department of Aisne in the Hauts-de-France region of northern France.

== Geography ==
Aizelles is some 20 km southeast of Laon and 30 km northwest of Reims. There are only three access roads to the commune: the D889 running north from Corbeny to the town of Aizelles, the D89 running east from the D1044 from the western side of the commune, and the D88 which enters from the northeast of the commune. All three roads intersect in the village of Aizelles.

The commune is mostly farmland; however, there is a large forest, the Bois de Berrieux, to the east of the town. This forest occupies about a quarter of the land area of the commune.

The Ruisseau de Fayau runs through the village and the commune from northwest and is joined by the Ru du Moulin river before flowing to the Miette river southeast of the commune which in turn flows to the river Aisne to the south.

== Administration ==
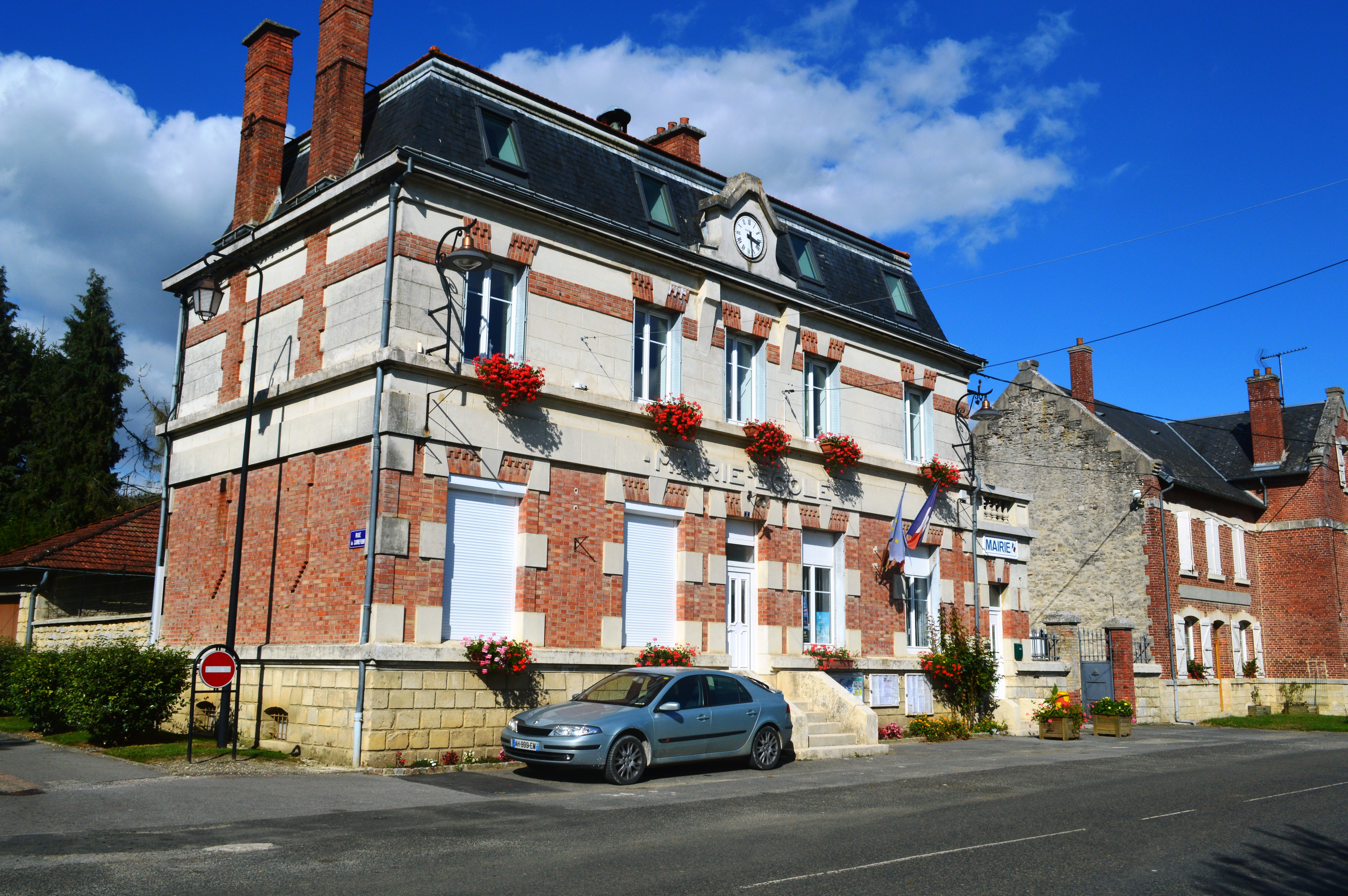
Town hall

List of Mayors of Aizelles

From	To	Name	Party	Position
2001	2008	Philippe Malpezzi	UMP	
2008	Present	Jean-Marie Merlo	DVD	

== Population ==
Historical population
Year	Pop.	±% p.a.
1968	105	—
1975	92	−1.87%
1982	85	−1.12%
1990	81	−0.60%
1999	94	+1.67%
2007	105	+1.39%
2012	113	+1.48%
2017	125	+2.04%
2023	118	−0.96%
Source: INSEE

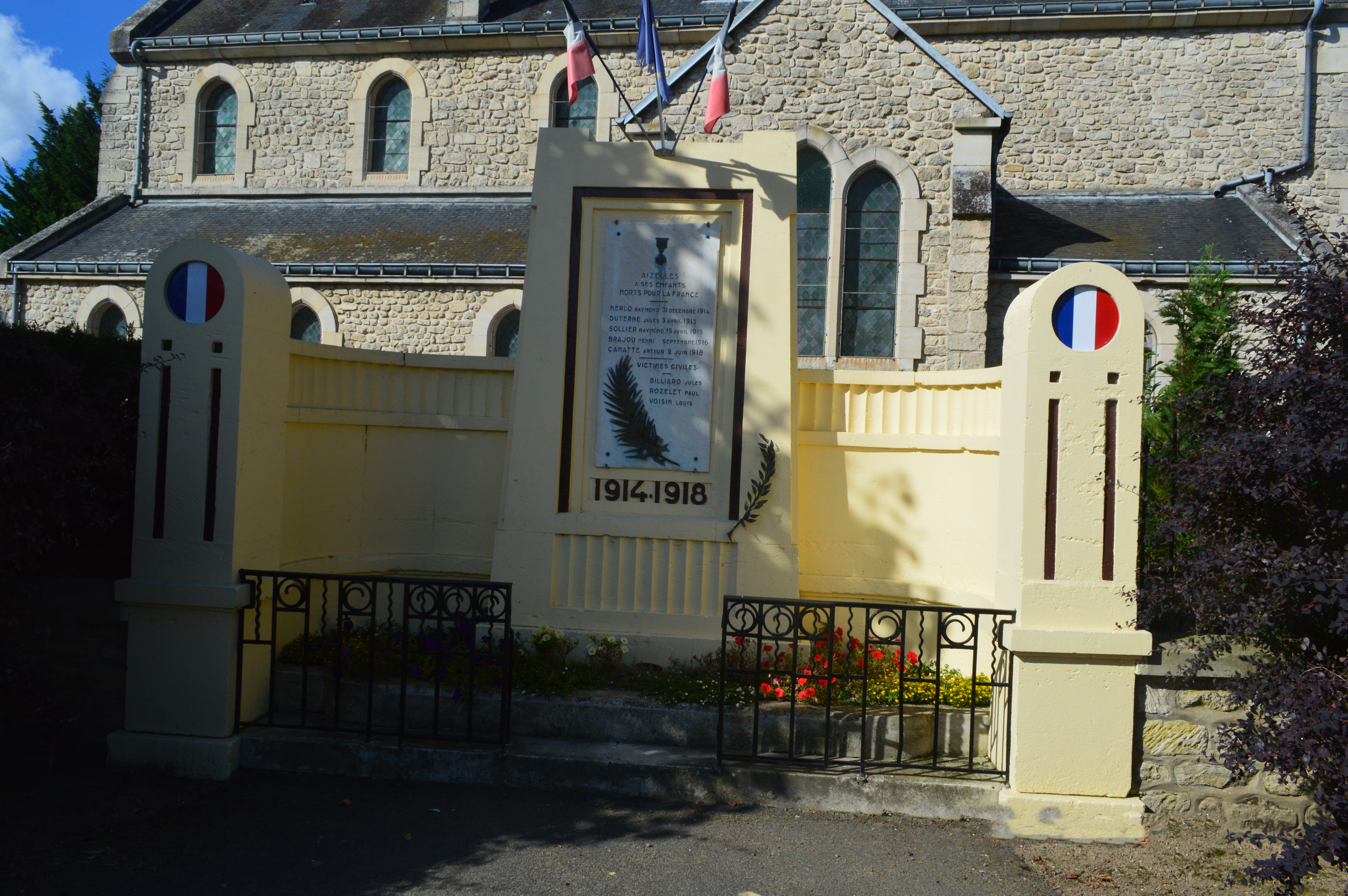
Aizelles War Memorial

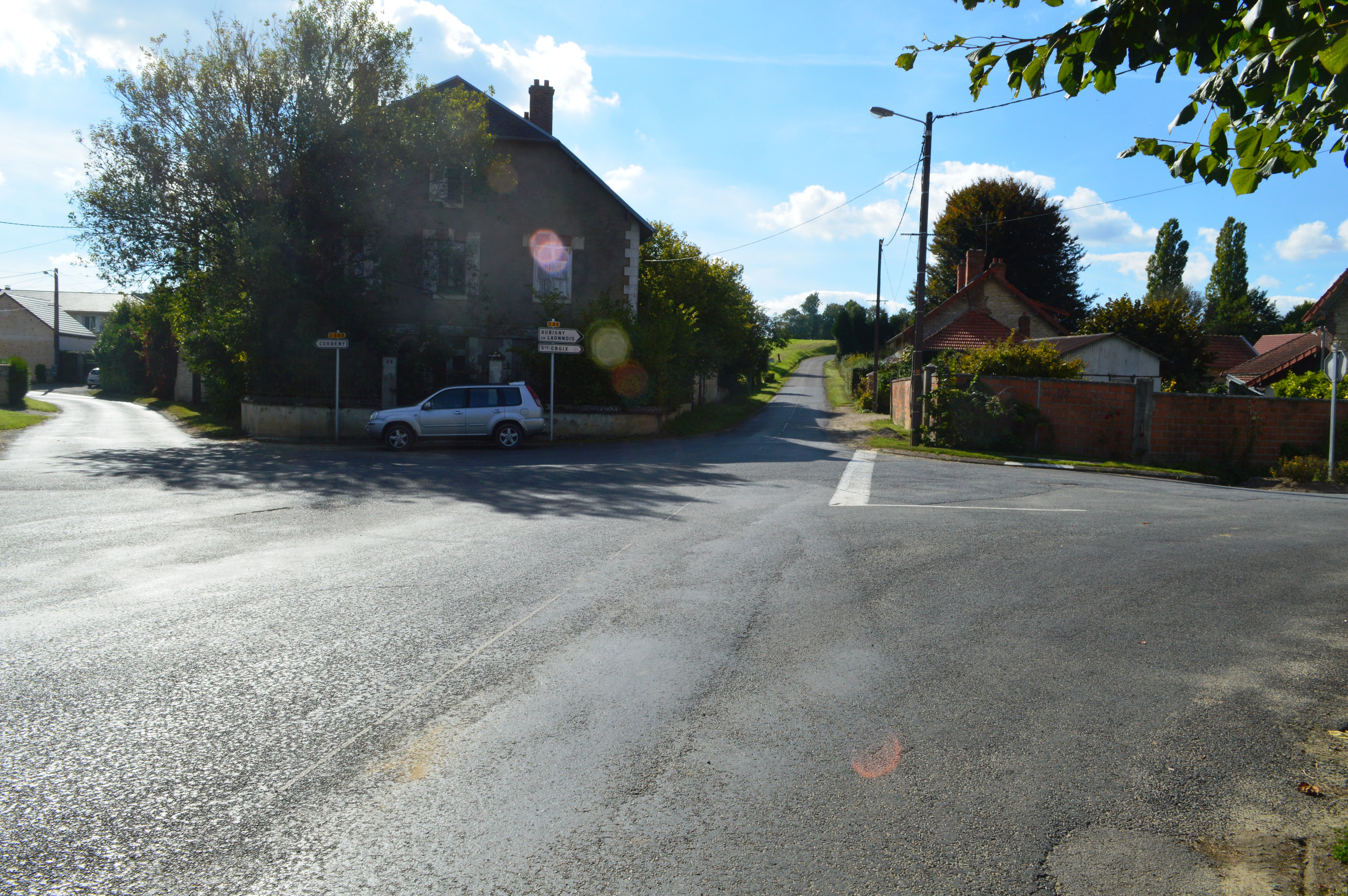
A street in Aizelles

== Sights ==
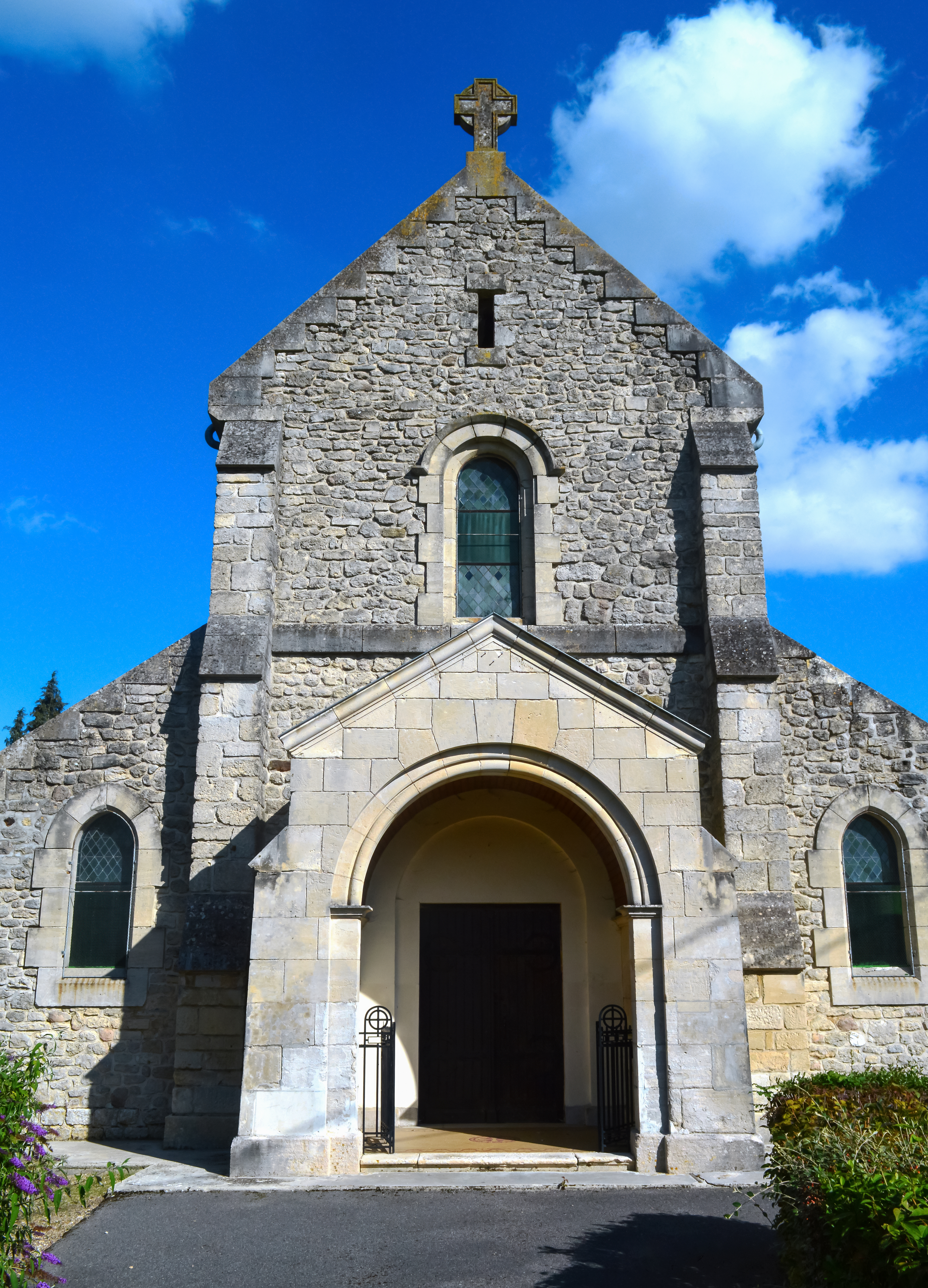
Church of Saint Quentin

- Church of Saint Quentin
- Space Galerie D'Art-Expo hosts regular exhibitions during the summer.

== Notable people linked to the commune ==
- Philippe Malpezzi
- Mhaize, sculptor and ceramist

== See also ==
- Communes of the Aisne department
