= Cuissy-et-Geny =

- Commune
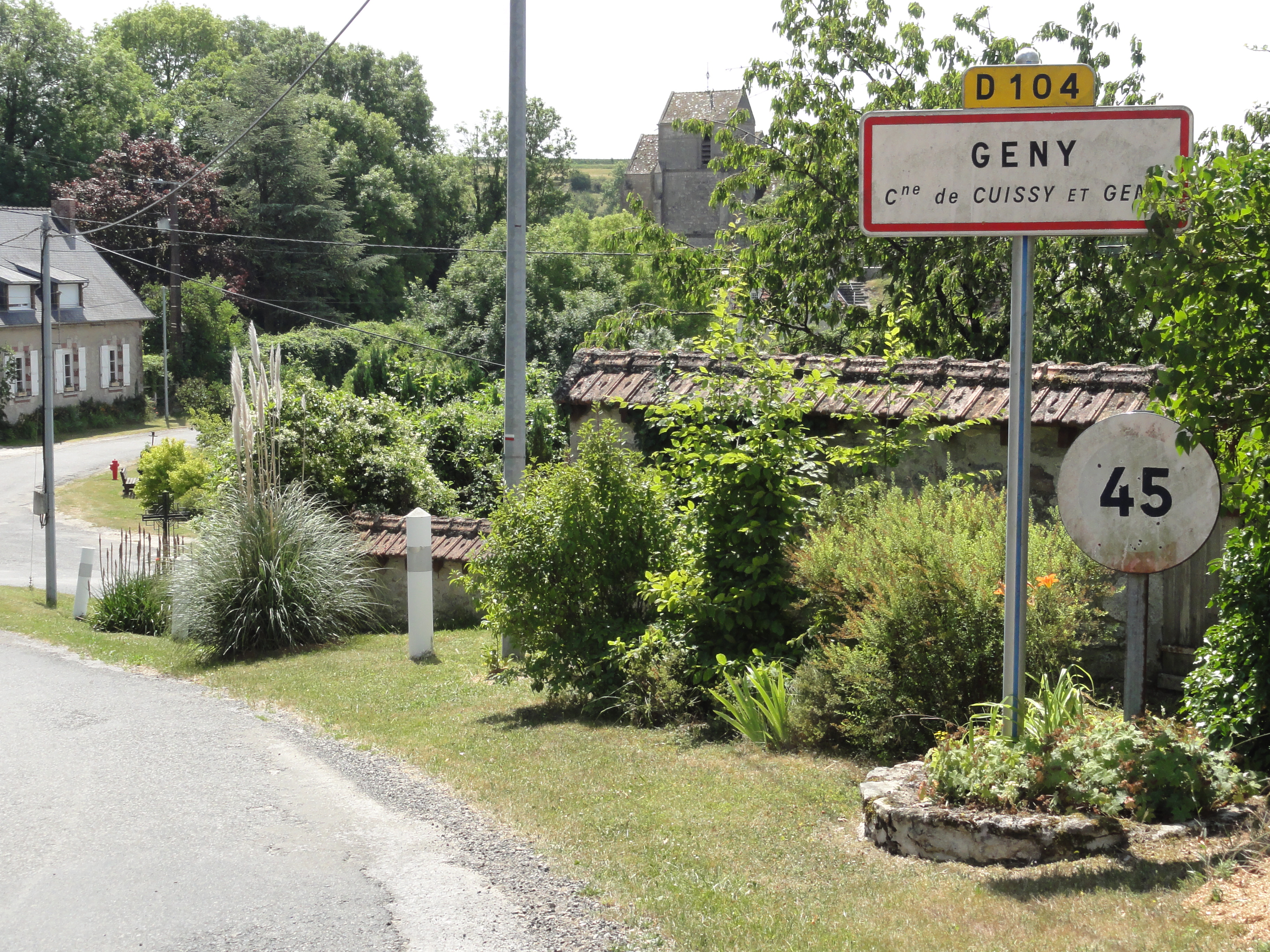
- The road into Cuissy-et-Geny
- Location of Cuissy-et-Geny
- Location within France Location within Hauts-de-France
- Coordinates: 49°24′42″N 3°42′10″E
- Country: France
- Region: Hauts-de-France
- Department: Aisne
- Arrondissement: Laon
- Canton: Villeneuve-sur-Aisne
- Intercommunality: Chemin des Dames

Government
  - Mayor (2026–32): Murielle Bonneville
- Area^{1}: 4.97 km^{2} (1.92 sq mi)
- Elevation: 115 m (377 ft)
- Highest elevation: 191 m (627 ft)
- Lowest elevation: 45 m (148 ft)
- Population (2023): 72
  - Density: 14/km^{2} (38/sq mi)
- Time zone: UTC+01:00 (CET)
  - Summer (DST): UTC+02:00 (CEST)
- INSEE/Postal code: 02252 /02160
- ^{1} French Land Register data, which excludes lakes, ponds, glaciers > 1 km^{2} (0.386 sq mi or 247 acres) and river estuaries.

Cuissy-et-Geny (French pronunciation: [kɥisi e ʒəni]) is a commune in the Aisne department in Hauts-de-France in northern France.

== Population ==
Historical population
Year	Pop.	±% p.a.
1968	70	—
1975	77	+1.37%
1982	61	−3.27%
1990	72	+2.09%
1999	59	−2.19%
2007	68	+1.79%
2012	62	−1.83%
2017	71	+2.75%
2023	72	+0.23%
Source: INSEE

== See also ==
- Communes of the Aisne department
