= Oulches-la-Vallée-Foulon =

- Commune
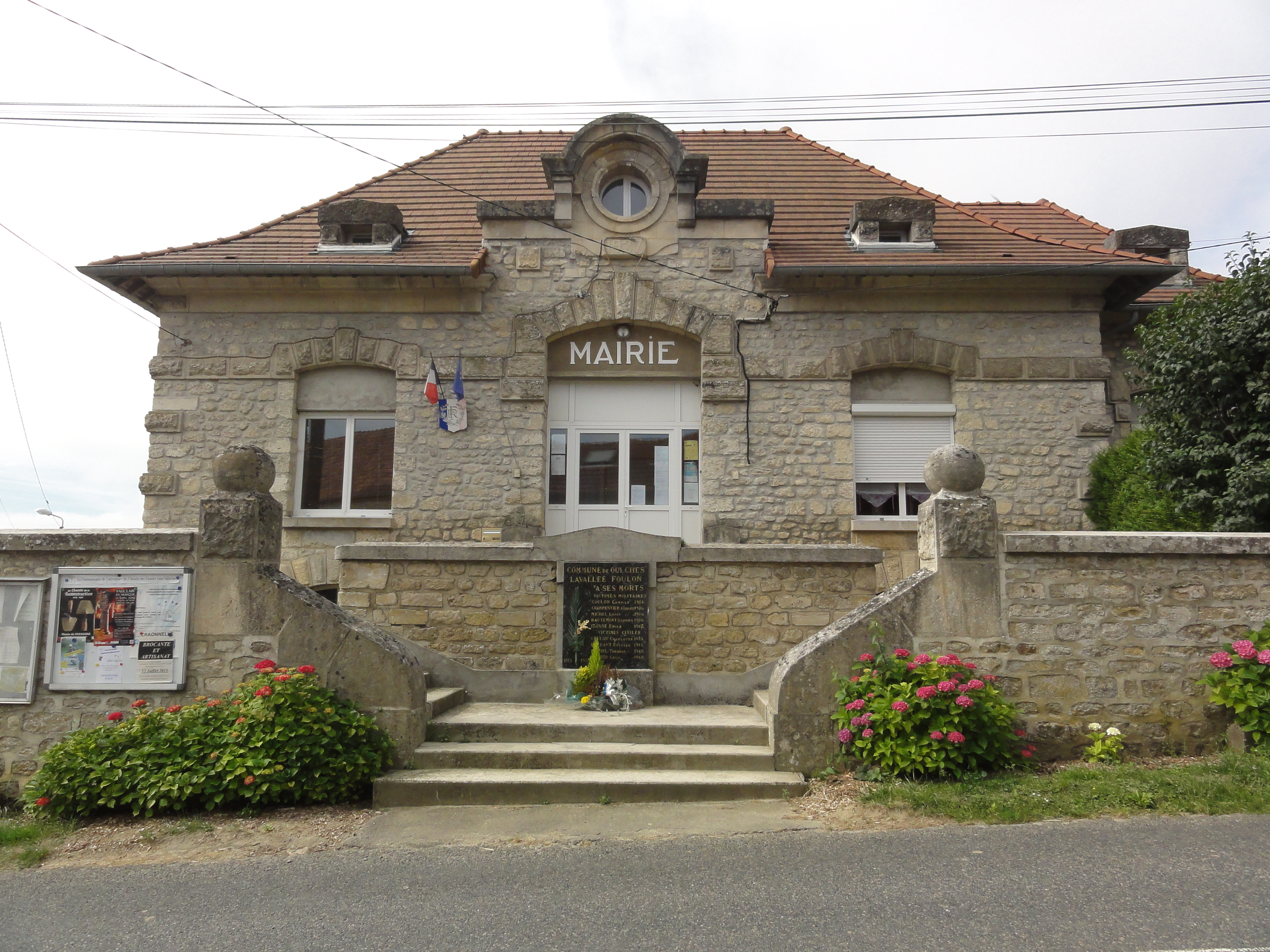
- The town hall of Oulches-la-Vallée-Foulon
- Location of Oulches-la-Vallée-Foulon
- Location within France Location within Hauts-de-France
- Coordinates: 49°25′47″N 3°44′47″E
- Country: France
- Region: Hauts-de-France
- Department: Aisne
- Arrondissement: Laon
- Canton: Villeneuve-sur-Aisne
- Intercommunality: Chemin des Dames

Government
  - Mayor (2026–32): Gaëlle Chotin
- Area^{1}: 4.45 km^{2} (1.72 sq mi)
- Elevation: 95 m (312 ft)
- Highest elevation: 194 m (636 ft)
- Lowest elevation: 70 m (230 ft)
- Population (2023): 80
  - Density: 18/km^{2} (47/sq mi)
- Time zone: UTC+01:00 (CET)
  - Summer (DST): UTC+02:00 (CEST)
- INSEE/Postal code: 02578 /02160
- ^{1} French Land Register data, which excludes lakes, ponds, glaciers > 1 km^{2} (0.386 sq mi or 247 acres) and river estuaries.

Oulches-la-Vallée-Foulon is a commune in the Aisne department in Hauts-de-France in northern France.

== Population ==
Historical population
Year	Pop.	±% p.a.
1968	53	—
1975	44	−2.62%
1982	42	−0.66%
1990	49	+1.95%
1999	49	+0.00%
2007	50	+0.25%
2012	86	+11.46%
2017	85	−0.23%
2023	80	−1.01%
Source: INSEE

== See also ==
- Communes of the Aisne department
