= Meurival =

- Commune
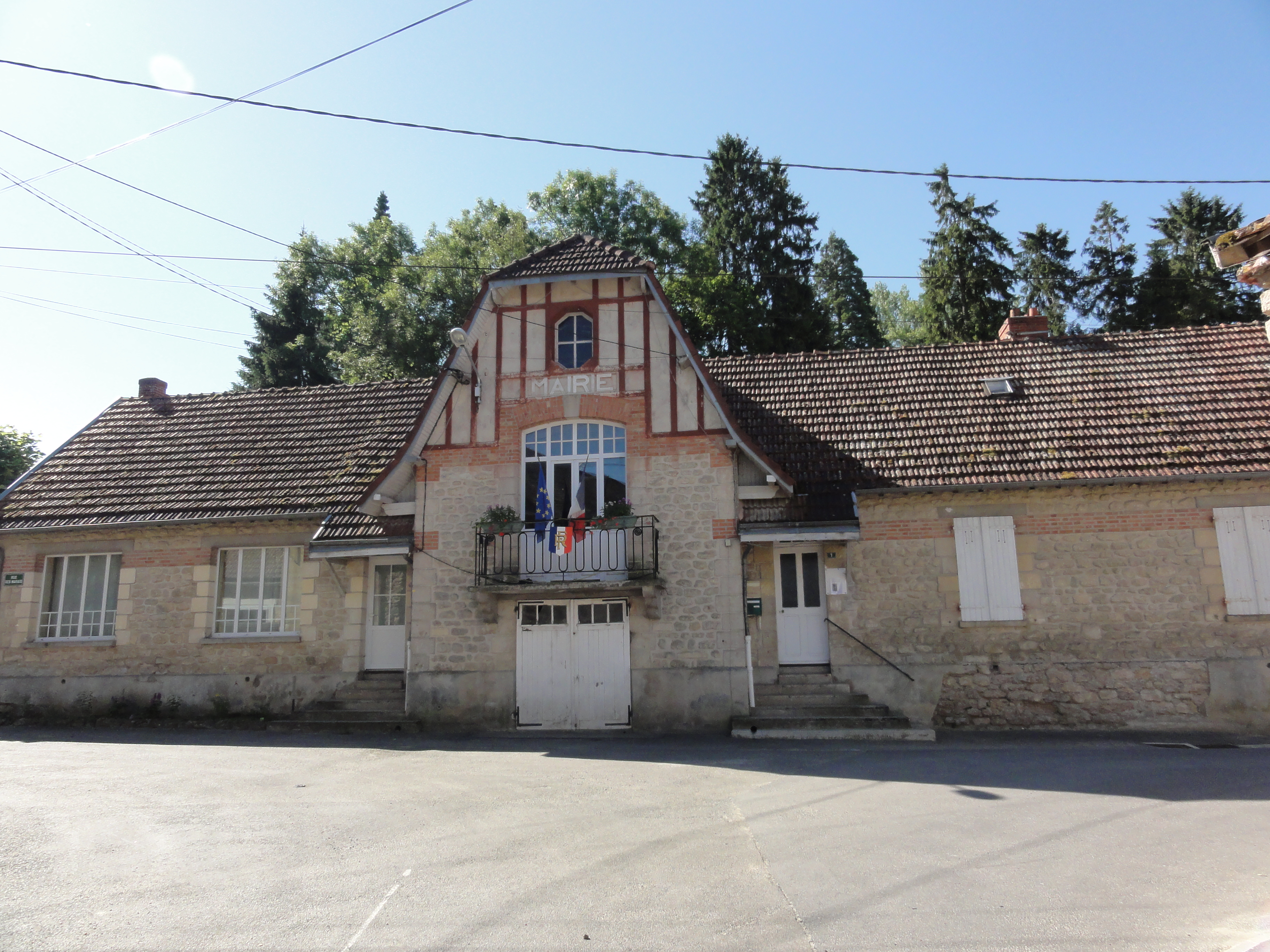
- The town hall of Meurival
- Location of Meurival
- Location within France Location within Hauts-de-France
- Coordinates: 49°21′30″N 3°45′43″E
- Country: France
- Region: Hauts-de-France
- Department: Aisne
- Arrondissement: Laon
- Canton: Villeneuve-sur-Aisne
- Intercommunality: Champagne Picarde

Government
  - Mayor (2026–32): Eliode Ziomeck
- Area^{1}: 2.89 km^{2} (1.12 sq mi)
- Elevation: 92 m (302 ft)
- Highest elevation: 187 m (614 ft)
- Lowest elevation: 72 m (236 ft)
- Population (2023): 56
  - Density: 19/km^{2} (50/sq mi)
- Time zone: UTC+01:00 (CET)
  - Summer (DST): UTC+02:00 (CEST)
- INSEE/Postal code: 02482 /02160
- ^{1} French Land Register data, which excludes lakes, ponds, glaciers > 1 km^{2} (0.386 sq mi or 247 acres) and river estuaries.

Meurival (French pronunciation: [møʁival]) is a commune in the Aisne department in Hauts-de-France in northern France.

== Population ==
Historical population
Year	Pop.	±% p.a.
1968	66	—
1975	46	−5.03%
1982	44	−0.63%
1990	51	+1.86%
1999	60	+1.82%
2007	59	−0.21%
2012	52	−2.49%
2017	52	+0.00%
2023	56	+1.24%
Source: INSEE

== See also ==
- Communes of the Aisne department
