= Proviseux-et-Plesnoy =

- Commune
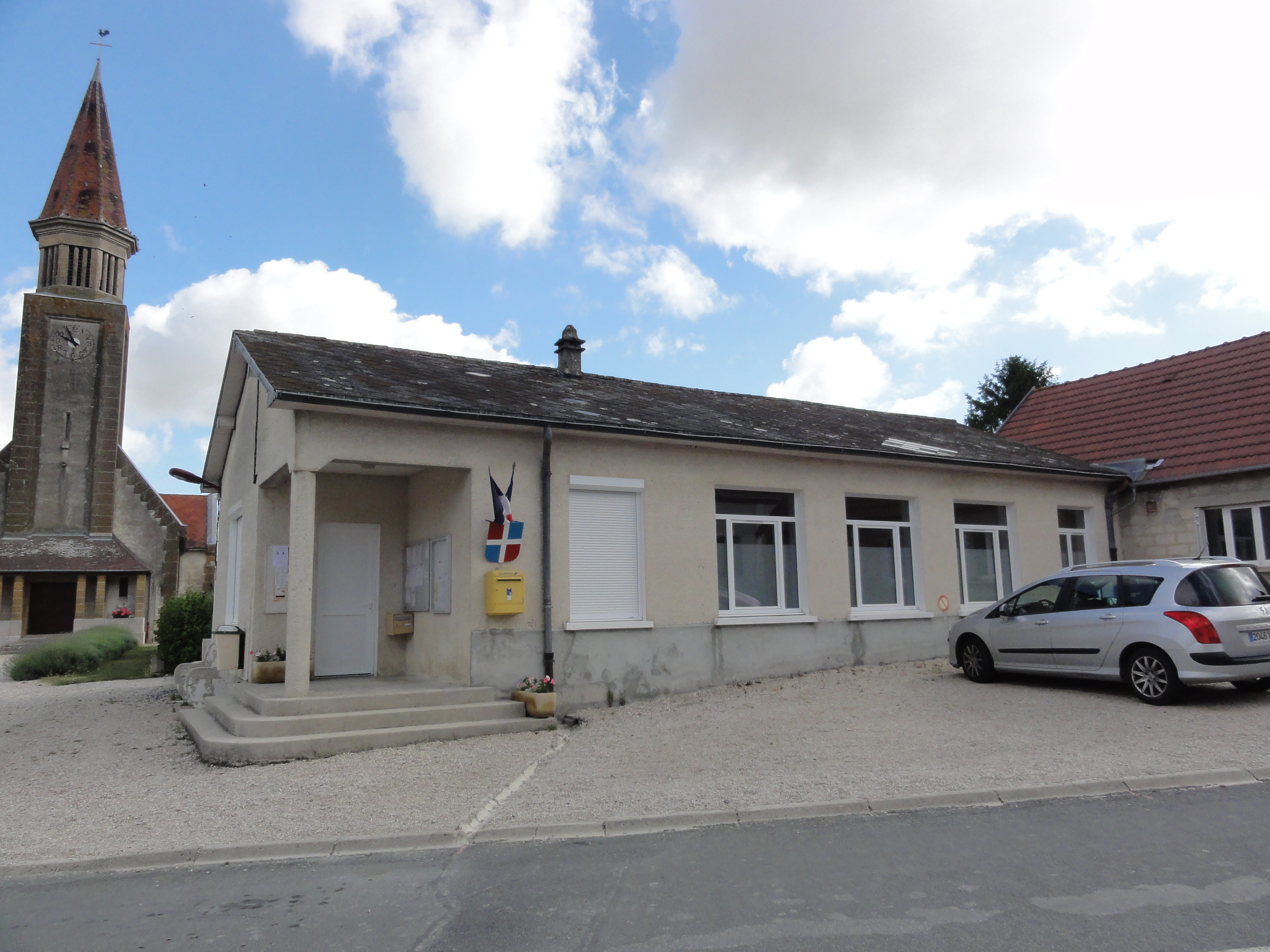
- The town hall and school of Proviseux-et-Plesnoy

- Coat of arms
- Location of Proviseux-et-Plesnoy
- Location within France Location within Hauts-de-France
- Coordinates: 49°27′56″N 4°00′38″E
- Country: France
- Region: Hauts-de-France
- Department: Aisne
- Arrondissement: Laon
- Canton: Villeneuve-sur-Aisne
- Intercommunality: Champagne Picarde

Government
  - Mayor (2026–32): Françoise Goossens
- Area^{1}: 11.21 km^{2} (4.33 sq mi)
- Elevation: 115 m (377 ft)
- Highest elevation: 143 m (469 ft)
- Lowest elevation: 73 m (240 ft)
- Population (2023): 136
  - Density: 12.1/km^{2} (31.4/sq mi)
- Time zone: UTC+01:00 (CET)
  - Summer (DST): UTC+02:00 (CEST)
- INSEE/Postal code: 02627 /02190
- ^{1} French Land Register data, which excludes lakes, ponds, glaciers > 1 km^{2} (0.386 sq mi or 247 acres) and river estuaries.

Proviseux-et-Plesnoy (French pronunciation: [pʁɔvizø e plɛnwa]) is a commune in the Aisne department in Hauts-de-France in northern France.

== Population ==
Historical population
| Year | Pop. | ±% p.a. |
|---|---|---|
| 1968 | 150 | — |
| 1975 | 107 | −4.71% |
| 1982 | 117 | +1.28% |
| 1990 | 110 | −0.77% |
| 1999 | 102 | −0.84% |
| 2007 | 101 | −0.12% |
| 2012 | 116 | +2.81% |
| 2017 | 120 | +0.68% |
| 2023 | 136 | +2.11% |
Source: INSEE

== See also ==
- Communes of the Aisne department
