= Bouffignereux =

- Commune
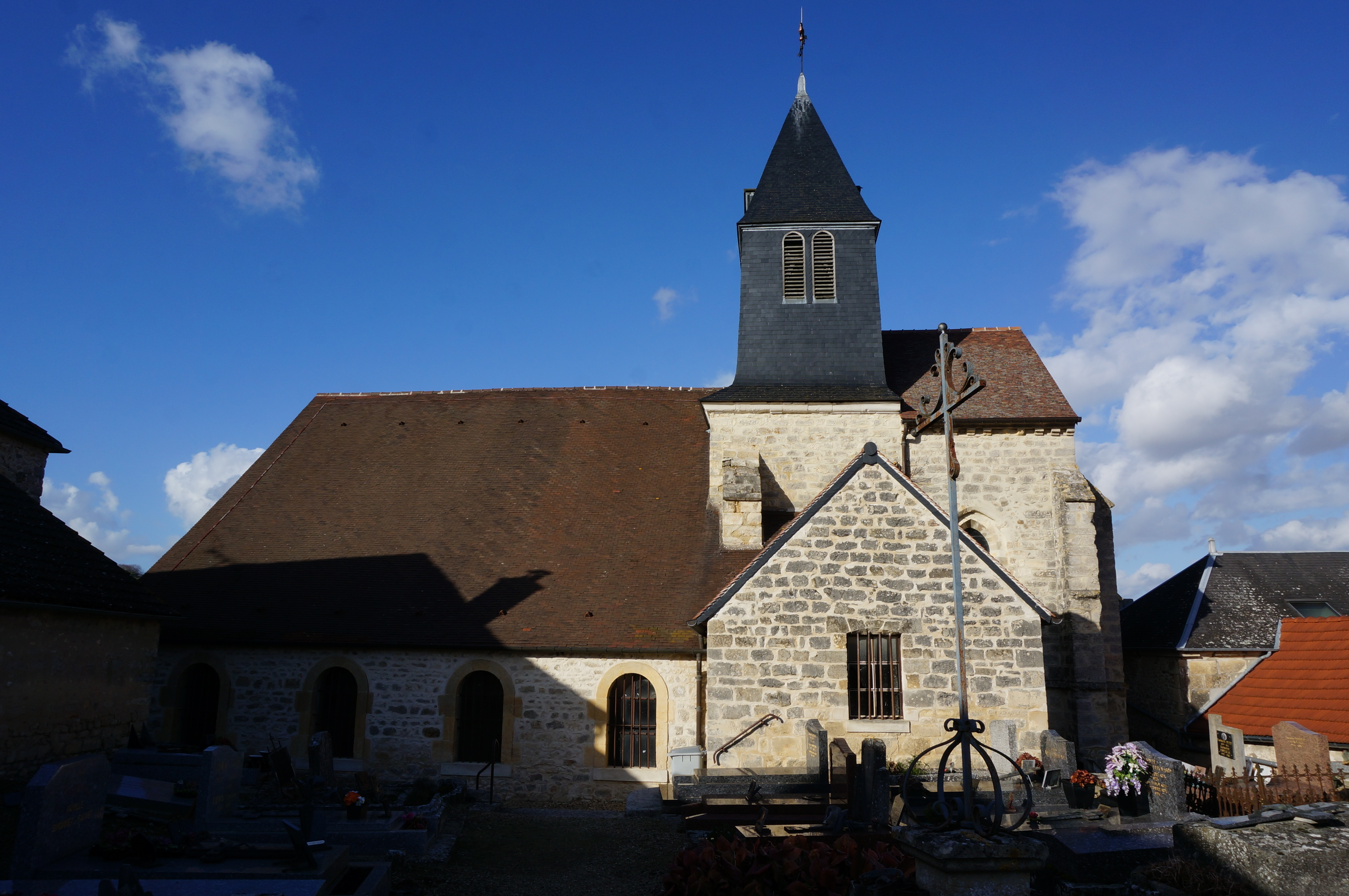
- The church of Bouffignereux.
- Location of Bouffignereux
- Location within France Location within Hauts-de-France
- Coordinates: 49°22′28″N 3°50′46″E
- Country: France
- Region: Hauts-de-France
- Department: Aisne
- Arrondissement: Laon
- Canton: Villeneuve-sur-Aisne
- Intercommunality: Champagne Picarde

Government
  - Mayor (2026–32): Dominique Evrard
- Area^{1}: 4.36 km^{2} (1.68 sq mi)
- Elevation: 76 m (249 ft)
- Highest elevation: 175 m (574 ft)
- Lowest elevation: 60 m (200 ft)
- Population (2023): 96
  - Density: 22/km^{2} (57/sq mi)
- Time zone: UTC+01:00 (CET)
  - Summer (DST): UTC+02:00 (CEST)
- INSEE/Postal code: 02104 /02160
- ^{1} French Land Register data, which excludes lakes, ponds, glaciers > 1 km^{2} (0.386 sq mi or 247 acres) and river estuaries.

Bouffignereux (French pronunciation: [bufiɲʁø]) is a commune in the department of Aisne in Hauts-de-France in northern France.

== Population ==
Historical population
| Year | Pop. | ±% p.a. |
|---|---|---|
| 1968 | 60 | — |
| 1975 | 59 | −0.24% |
| 1982 | 89 | +6.05% |
| 1990 | 111 | +2.80% |
| 1999 | 110 | −0.10% |
| 2007 | 109 | −0.11% |
| 2012 | 103 | −1.13% |
| 2017 | 102 | −0.19% |
| 2023 | 96 | −1.01% |
Source: INSEE

== See also ==
- Communes of the Aisne department
