= Pignicourt =

- Commune
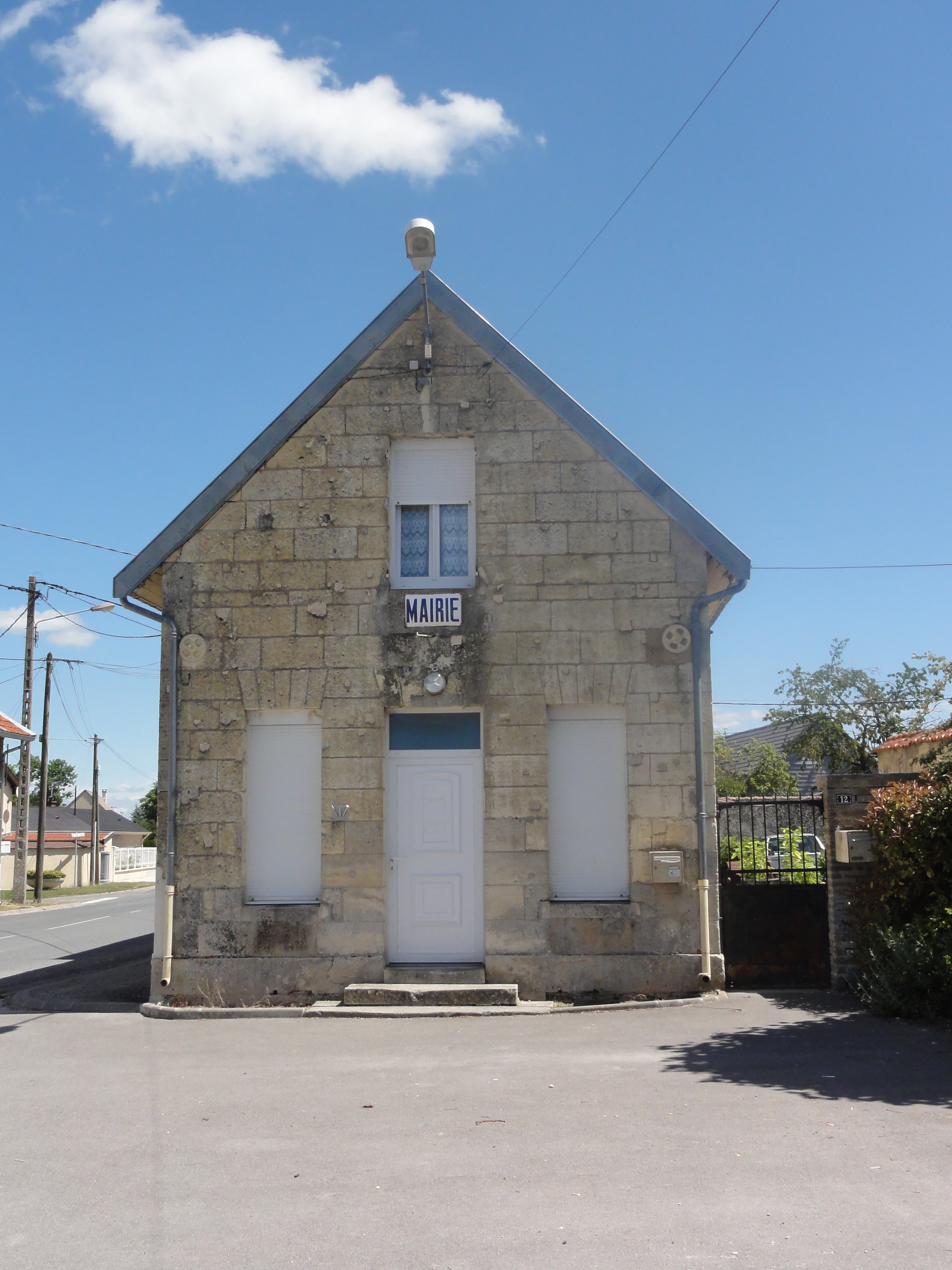
- The town hall of Pignicourt
- Location of Pignicourt
- Location within France Location within Hauts-de-France
- Coordinates: 49°24′59″N 4°01′53″E
- Country: France
- Region: Hauts-de-France
- Department: Aisne
- Arrondissement: Laon
- Canton: Villeneuve-sur-Aisne
- Intercommunality: Champagne Picarde

Government
  - Mayor (2026–32): Damien Robert
- Area^{1}: 7.01 km^{2} (2.71 sq mi)
- Elevation: 60 m (200 ft)
- Highest elevation: 87 m (285 ft)
- Lowest elevation: 55 m (180 ft)
- Population (2023): 173
  - Density: 24.7/km^{2} (63.9/sq mi)
- Time zone: UTC+01:00 (CET)
  - Summer (DST): UTC+02:00 (CEST)
- INSEE/Postal code: 02601 /02190
- ^{1} French Land Register data, which excludes lakes, ponds, glaciers > 1 km^{2} (0.386 sq mi or 247 acres) and river estuaries.

Pignicourt (French pronunciation: [piɲikuʁ]) is a commune in the Aisne department in Hauts-de-France in northern France.

== Population ==
Historical population
| Year | Pop. | ±% p.a. |
|---|---|---|
| 1968 | 115 | — |
| 1975 | 78 | −5.40% |
| 1982 | 85 | +1.24% |
| 1990 | 96 | +1.53% |
| 1999 | 136 | +3.95% |
| 2007 | 135 | −0.09% |
| 2012 | 182 | +6.16% |
| 2017 | 197 | +1.60% |
| 2023 | 173 | −2.14% |
Source: INSEE

== See also ==
- Communes of the Aisne department
