= Concevreux =

- Commune
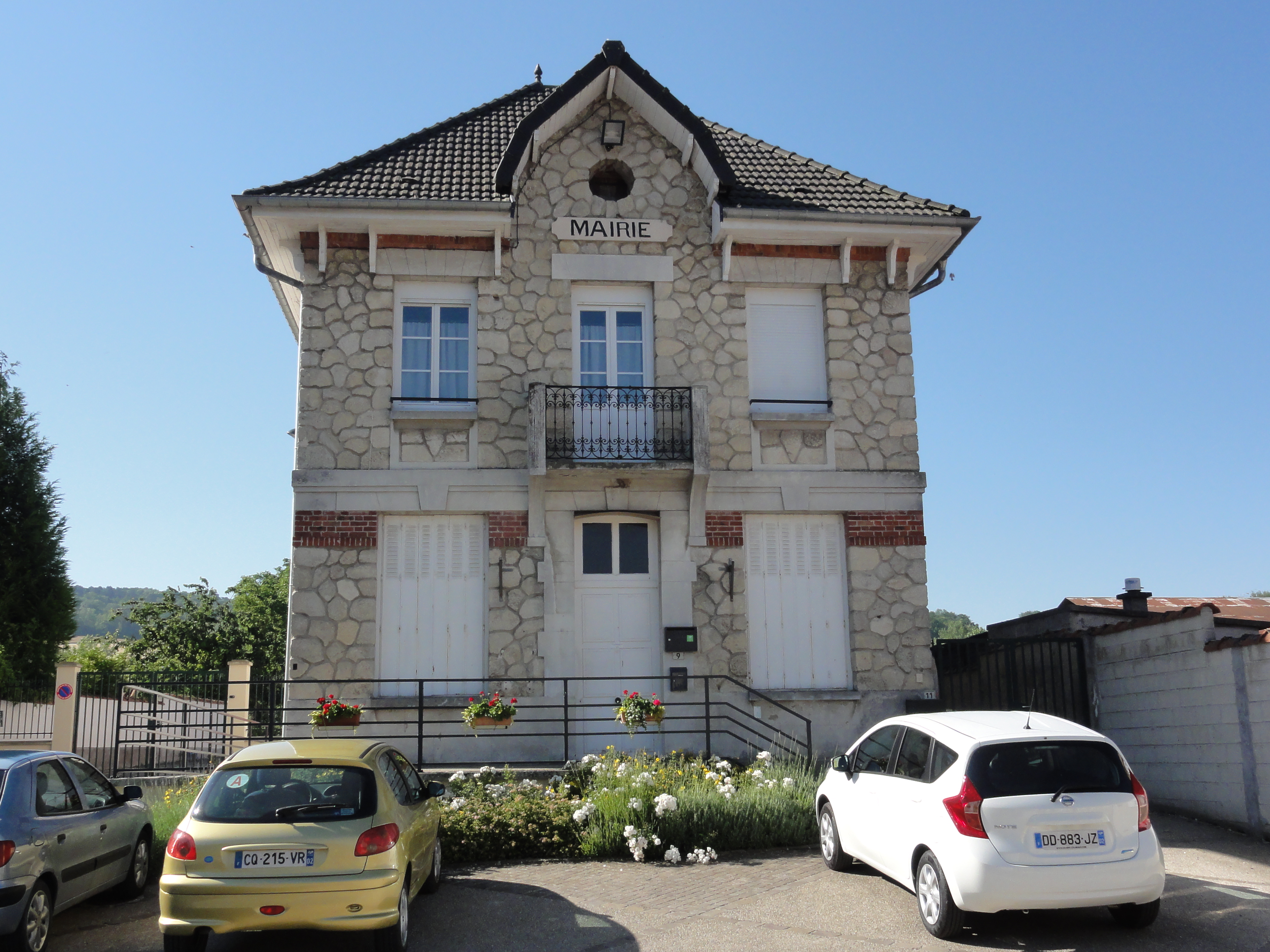
- The town hall of Concevreux
- Location of Concevreux
- Location within France Location within Hauts-de-France
- Coordinates: 49°22′38″N 3°47′24″E
- Country: France
- Region: Hauts-de-France
- Department: Aisne
- Arrondissement: Laon
- Canton: Villeneuve-sur-Aisne
- Intercommunality: Champagne Picarde

Government
  - Mayor (2026–32): Valérie Seclier
- Area^{1}: 12.51 km^{2} (4.83 sq mi)
- Elevation: 51 m (167 ft)
- Highest elevation: 206 m (676 ft)
- Lowest elevation: 45 m (148 ft)
- Population (2023): 256
  - Density: 20.5/km^{2} (53.0/sq mi)
- Time zone: UTC+01:00 (CET)
  - Summer (DST): UTC+02:00 (CEST)
- INSEE/Postal code: 02208 /02160
- ^{1} French Land Register data, which excludes lakes, ponds, glaciers > 1 km^{2} (0.386 sq mi or 247 acres) and river estuaries.

Concevreux (French pronunciation: [kɔ̃səvʁø]) is a commune in the Aisne department in Hauts-de-France in northern France.

== Population ==
Historical population
| Year | Pop. | ±% p.a. |
|---|---|---|
| 1968 | 170 | — |
| 1975 | 167 | −0.25% |
| 1982 | 152 | −1.34% |
| 1990 | 159 | +0.56% |
| 1999 | 201 | +2.64% |
| 2007 | 267 | +3.61% |
| 2012 | 268 | +0.07% |
| 2017 | 278 | +0.74% |
| 2023 | 256 | −1.36% |
Source: INSEE

== See also ==
- Communes of the Aisne department
