= Muscourt =

- Commune
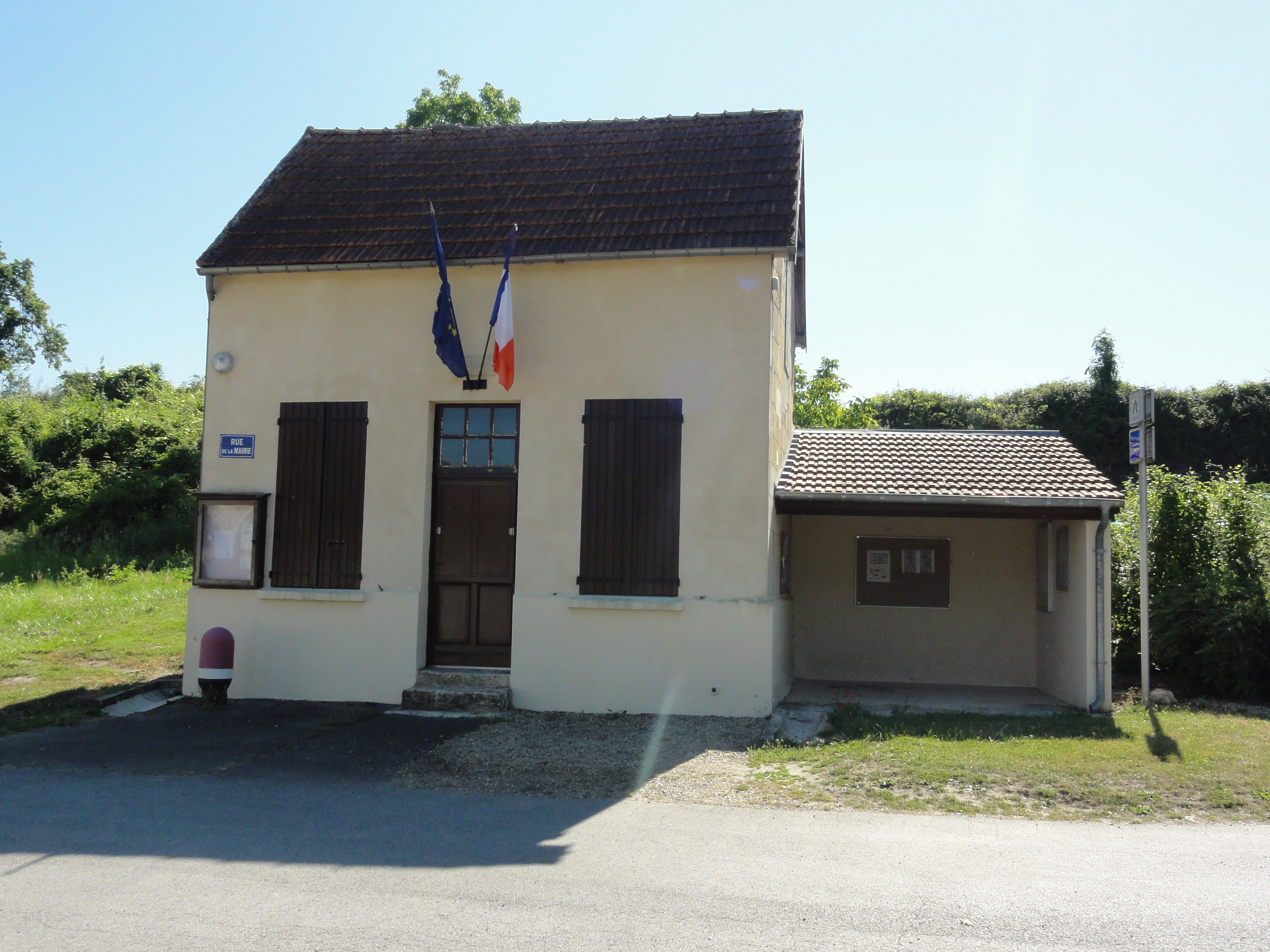
- The town hall of Muscourt
- Location of Muscourt
- Location within France Location within Hauts-de-France
- Coordinates: 49°21′50″N 3°44′54″E
- Country: France
- Region: Hauts-de-France
- Department: Aisne
- Arrondissement: Laon
- Canton: Villeneuve-sur-Aisne
- Intercommunality: Champagne Picarde

Government
  - Mayor (2026–32): Olivier Verhoestraete
- Area^{1}: 2.18 km^{2} (0.84 sq mi)
- Elevation: 90 m (300 ft)
- Highest elevation: 187 m (614 ft)
- Lowest elevation: 64 m (210 ft)
- Population (2023): 44
  - Density: 20/km^{2} (52/sq mi)
- Time zone: UTC+01:00 (CET)
  - Summer (DST): UTC+02:00 (CEST)
- INSEE/Postal code: 02534 /02160
- ^{1} French Land Register data, which excludes lakes, ponds, glaciers > 1 km^{2} (0.386 sq mi or 247 acres) and river estuaries.

Muscourt is a commune in the Aisne department in Hauts-de-France in northern France.

== Population ==
Historical population
Year	Pop.	±% p.a.
1968	68	—
1975	56	−2.74%
1982	33	−7.28%
1990	40	+2.43%
1999	36	−1.16%
2007	42	+1.95%
2012	52	+4.36%
2017	52	+0.00%
2023	44	−2.75%
Source: INSEE

== See also ==
- Communes of the Aisne department
