= Gizy =

- Commune
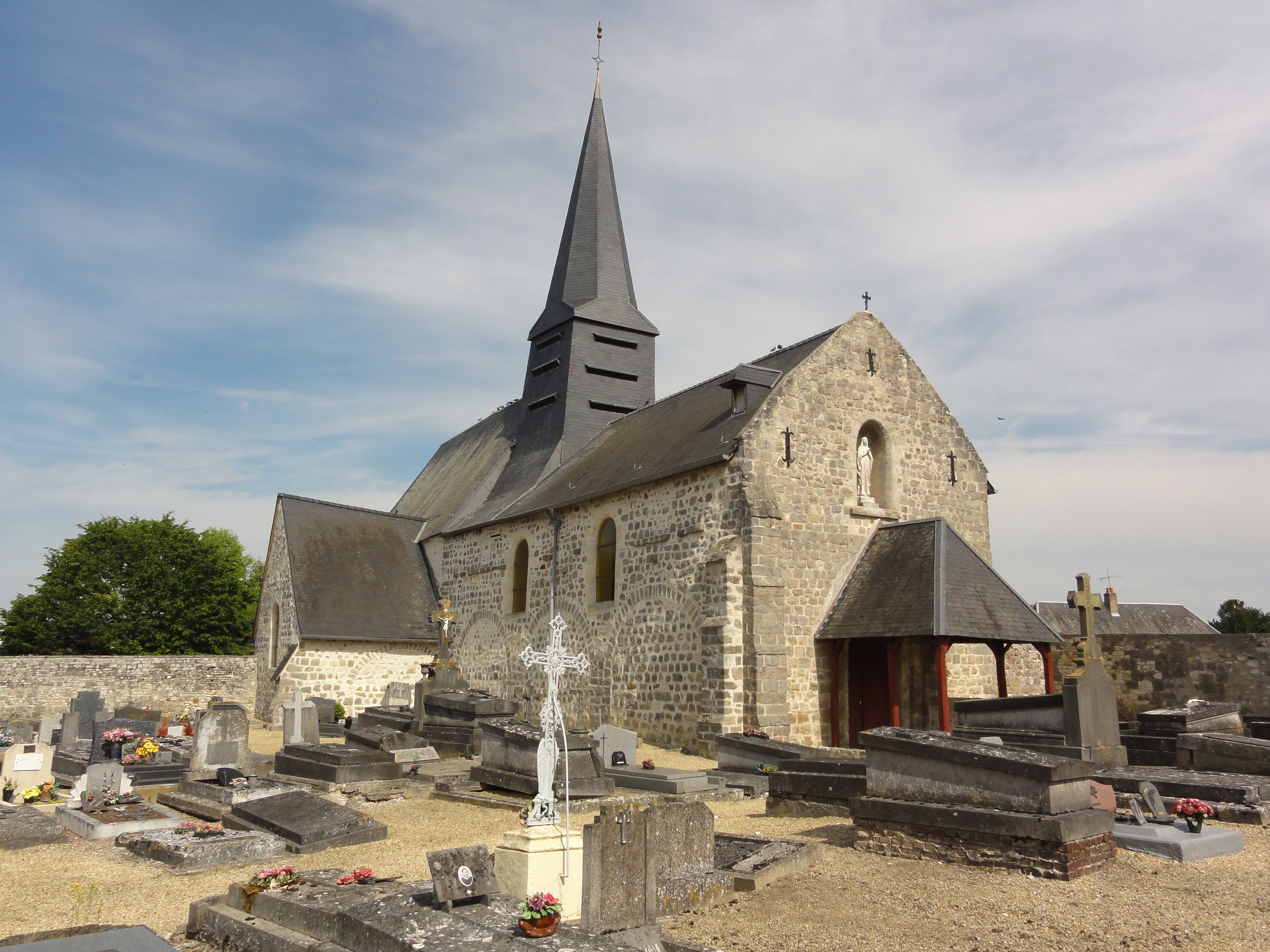
- The church of Gizy
- Location of Gizy
- Location within France Location within Hauts-de-France
- Coordinates: 49°36′05″N 3°46′31″E
- Country: France
- Region: Hauts-de-France
- Department: Aisne
- Arrondissement: Laon
- Canton: Villeneuve-sur-Aisne
- Intercommunality: Champagne Picarde

Government
  - Mayor (2026–32): Laëtitia Bour
- Area^{1}: 10.25 km^{2} (3.96 sq mi)
- Elevation: 77 m (253 ft)
- Highest elevation: 95 m (312 ft)
- Lowest elevation: 69 m (226 ft)
- Population (2023): 630
  - Density: 61/km^{2} (160/sq mi)
- Time zone: UTC+01:00 (CET)
  - Summer (DST): UTC+02:00 (CEST)
- INSEE/Postal code: 02346 /02350
- ^{1} French Land Register data, which excludes lakes, ponds, glaciers > 1 km^{2} (0.386 sq mi or 247 acres) and river estuaries.

Gizy (French pronunciation: [ʒizi]) is a commune in the Aisne department in Hauts-de-France in northern France.

== Population ==
Historical population
Year	Pop.	±% p.a.
1968	516	—
1975	519	+0.08%
1982	695	+4.26%
1990	652	−0.80%
1999	662	+0.17%
2007	695	+0.61%
2012	675	−0.58%
2017	672	−0.09%
2023	630	−1.07%
Source: INSEE

== See also ==
- Communes of the Aisne department
