= Chivres-en-Laonnois =

- Commune
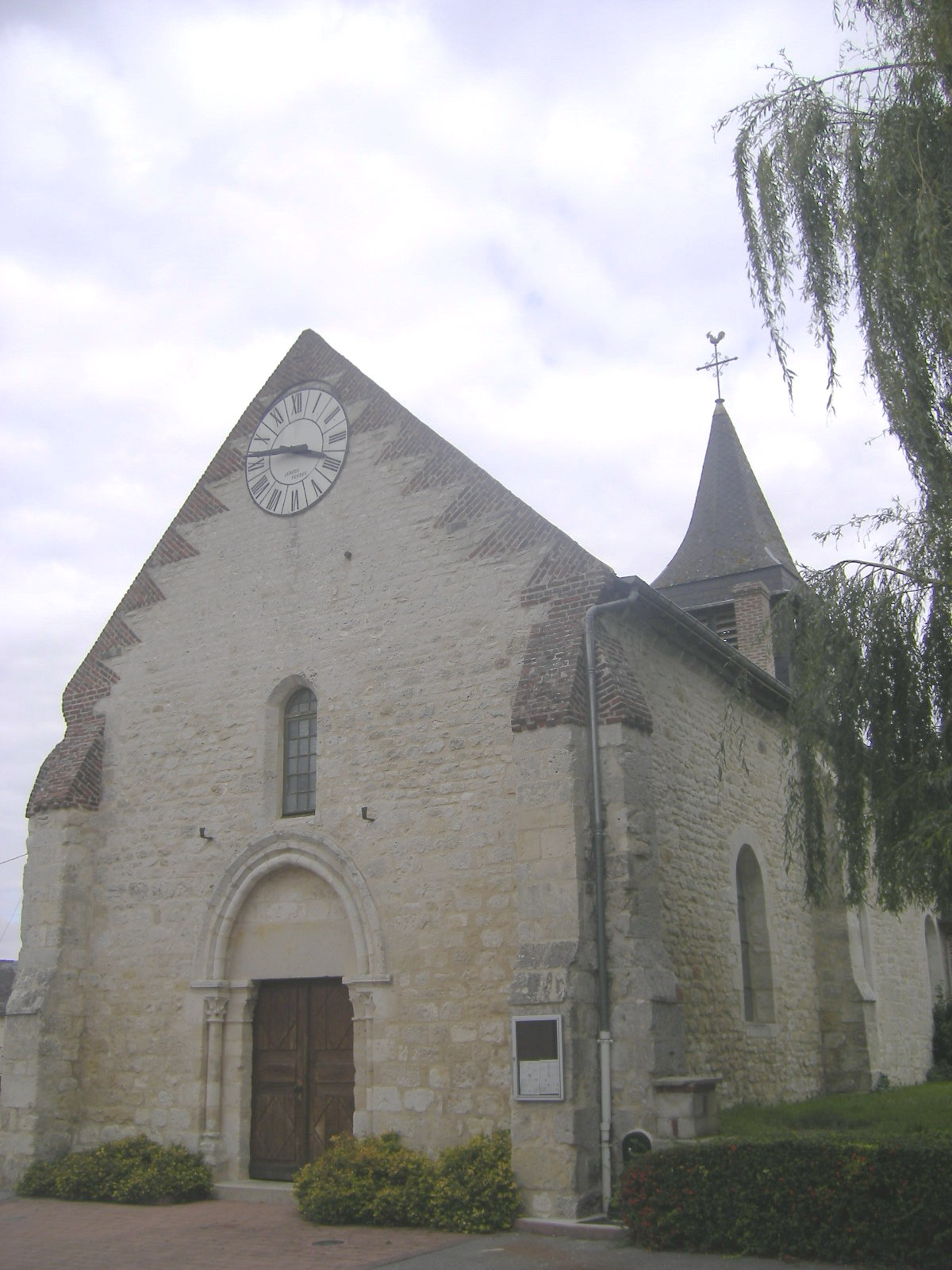
- The church of Chivres-en-Laonnois
- Location of Chivres-en-Laonnois
- Location within France Location within Hauts-de-France
- Coordinates: 49°38′02″N 3°50′36″E
- Country: France
- Region: Hauts-de-France
- Department: Aisne
- Arrondissement: Laon
- Canton: Villeneuve-sur-Aisne
- Intercommunality: Champagne Picarde

Government
  - Mayor (2026–32): Philippe Ducat
- Area^{1}: 13.56 km^{2} (5.24 sq mi)
- Elevation: 78 m (256 ft)
- Highest elevation: 116 m (381 ft)
- Lowest elevation: 68 m (223 ft)
- Population (2023): 359
  - Density: 26.5/km^{2} (68.6/sq mi)
- Time zone: UTC+01:00 (CET)
  - Summer (DST): UTC+02:00 (CEST)
- INSEE/Postal code: 02189 /02350
- ^{1} French Land Register data, which excludes lakes, ponds, glaciers > 1 km^{2} (0.386 sq mi or 247 acres) and river estuaries.

Chivres-en-Laonnois is a commune in the Aisne department in Hauts-de-France in northern France.

== Population ==
Historical population
Year	Pop.	±% p.a.
1968	329	—
1975	320	−0.40%
1982	305	−0.68%
1990	321	+0.64%
1999	339	+0.61%
2007	346	+0.26%
2012	374	+1.57%
2017	362	−0.65%
2023	359	−0.14%
Source: INSEE

== See also ==
- Communes of the Aisne department
