= Canton of Villeneuve-sur-Aisne =

Coordinates: 49.44°N 3.97°E

- Canton
- Situation of the canton of Villeneuve-sur-Aisne in the department of Aisne
- Country: France
- Region: Hauts-de-France
- Department: Aisne
- No. of communes: {{{nbcomm}}}
- Population (2023): 26,370
- INSEE code: 0206

The canton of Villeneuve-sur-Aisne (before 2021: canton of Guignicourt) is an administrative division of the Aisne department, in northern France. It was created at the French canton reorganisation which came into effect in March 2015. Its seat is in Villeneuve-sur-Aisne.

It consists of the following communes:

1. Aguilcourt
2. Aizelles
3. Amifontaine
4. Aubigny-en-Laonnois
5. Beaurieux
6. Berrieux
7. Berry-au-Bac
8. Bertricourt
9. Boncourt
10. Bouconville-Vauclair
11. Bouffignereux
12. Bourg-et-Comin
13. Braye-en-Laonnois
14. Bucy-lès-Pierrepont
15. Chaudardes
16. Chermizy-Ailles
17. Chevregny
18. Chivres-en-Laonnois
19. Concevreux
20. Condé-sur-Suippe
21. Corbeny
22. Coucy-lès-Eppes
23. Courtrizy-et-Fussigny
24. Craonne
25. Craonnelle
26. Cuiry-lès-Chaudardes
27. Cuissy-et-Geny
28. Ébouleau
29. Évergnicourt
30. Gizy
31. Goudelancourt-lès-Berrieux
32. Goudelancourt-lès-Pierrepont
33. Guyencourt
34. Jumigny
35. Juvincourt-et-Damary
36. Lappion
37. Liesse-Notre-Dame
38. Lor
39. Mâchecourt
40. Maizy
41. La Malmaison
42. Marchais
43. Mauregny-en-Haye
44. Meurival
45. Missy-lès-Pierrepont
46. Montaigu
47. Moulins
48. Moussy-Verneuil
49. Muscourt
50. Neufchâtel-sur-Aisne
51. Neuville-sur-Ailette
52. Nizy-le-Comte
53. Œuilly
54. Orainville
55. Oulches-la-Vallée-Foulon
56. Paissy
57. Pancy-Courtecon
58. Pargnan
59. Pignicourt
60. Ployart-et-Vaurseine
61. Pontavert
62. Prouvais
63. Proviseux-et-Plesnoy
64. Roucy
65. Sainte-Croix
66. Sainte-Preuve
67. Saint-Erme-Outre-et-Ramecourt
68. Saint-Thomas
69. La Selve
70. Sissonne
71. Trucy
72. Variscourt
73. Vassogne
74. Vendresse-Beaulne
75. La Ville-aux-Bois-lès-Pontavert
76. Villeneuve-sur-Aisne
