= Chaudardes =

- Commune
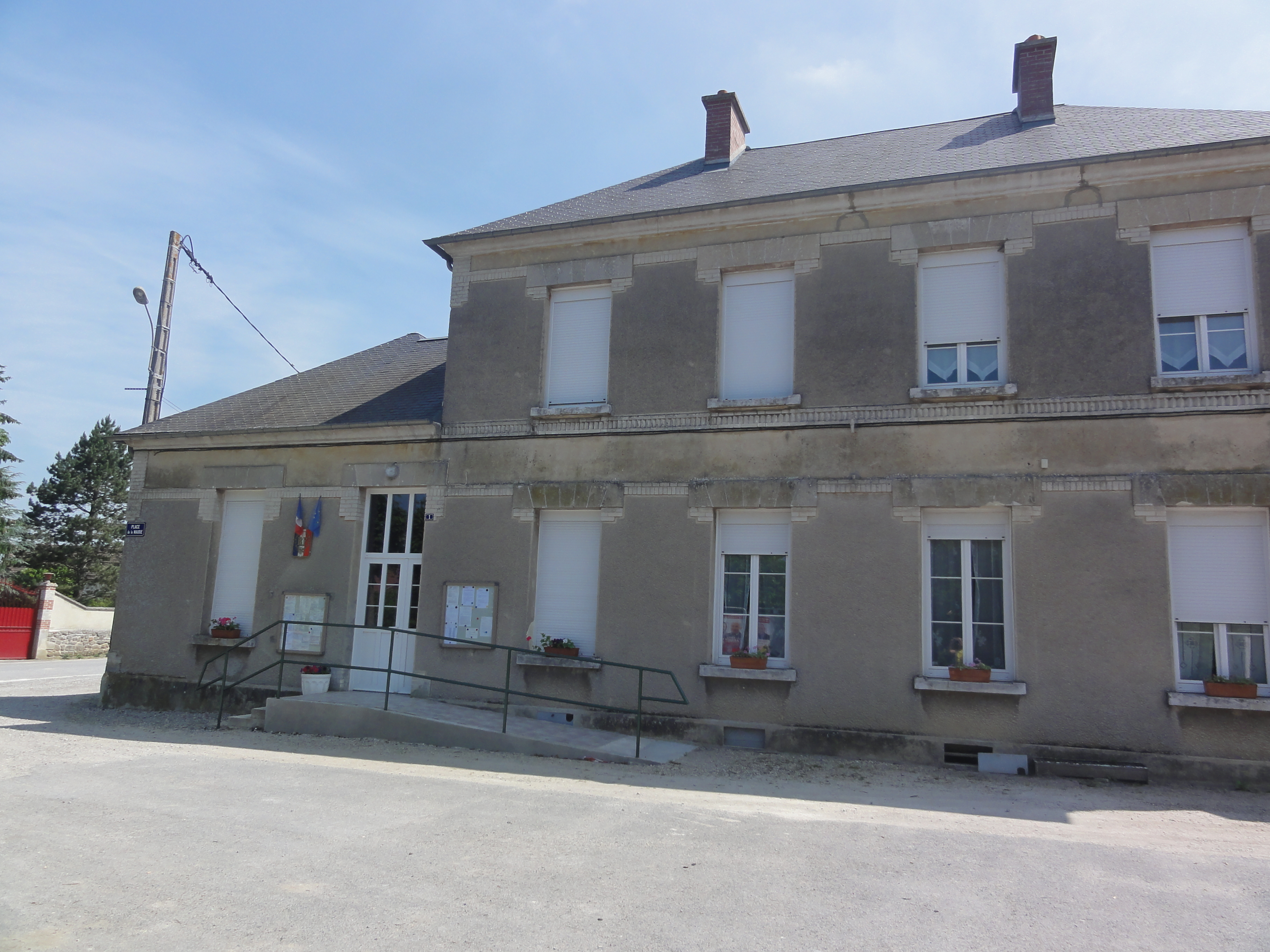
- Town hall

- Coat of arms
- Location of Chaudardes
- Location within France Location within Hauts-de-France
- Coordinates: 49°23′33″N 3°47′32″E
- Country: France
- Region: Hauts-de-France
- Department: Aisne
- Arrondissement: Laon
- Canton: Villeneuve-sur-Aisne
- Intercommunality: Champagne Picarde

Government
  - Mayor (2026–32): Christophe Boselli
- Area^{1}: 4.7 km^{2} (1.8 sq mi)
- Elevation: 80 m (260 ft)
- Highest elevation: 78 m (256 ft)
- Lowest elevation: 47 m (154 ft)
- Population (2023): 91
  - Density: 19/km^{2} (50/sq mi)
- Time zone: UTC+01:00 (CET)
  - Summer (DST): UTC+02:00 (CEST)
- INSEE/Postal code: 02171 /02160
- ^{1} French Land Register data, which excludes lakes, ponds, glaciers > 1 km^{2} (0.386 sq mi or 247 acres) and river estuaries.

Chaudardes (French pronunciation: [ʃodaʁd]) is a commune in the Aisne department in Hauts-de-France in northern France.

== Population ==
Historical population
Year	Pop.	±% p.a.
1968	62	—
1975	54	−1.95%
1982	46	−2.26%
1990	68	+5.01%
1999	82	+2.10%
2007	85	+0.45%
2012	88	+0.70%
2017	87	−0.23%
2023	91	+0.75%
Source: INSEE

== Sights ==
- The church, which is a registered historic monument.
- The "lavoir", a public place where the women used to wash their clothes and which is also a "monument historique" because of its Blessed Virgin Mary statue whose color is still visible here and there
- The chapel, which is behind the lavoir and which can no longer be visited (stones fall)
- A statue of the Virgin Mary with the infant Jesus on the village square, near the church
- The graveyard
- The river Aisne and the ruins of a bridge which was designed to link Chaudardes with Concevreux, a village on the other side of the river (this bridge has been destroyed during the World War I)

== See also ==
- Communes of the Aisne department
