= Sainte-Preuve =

- Commune
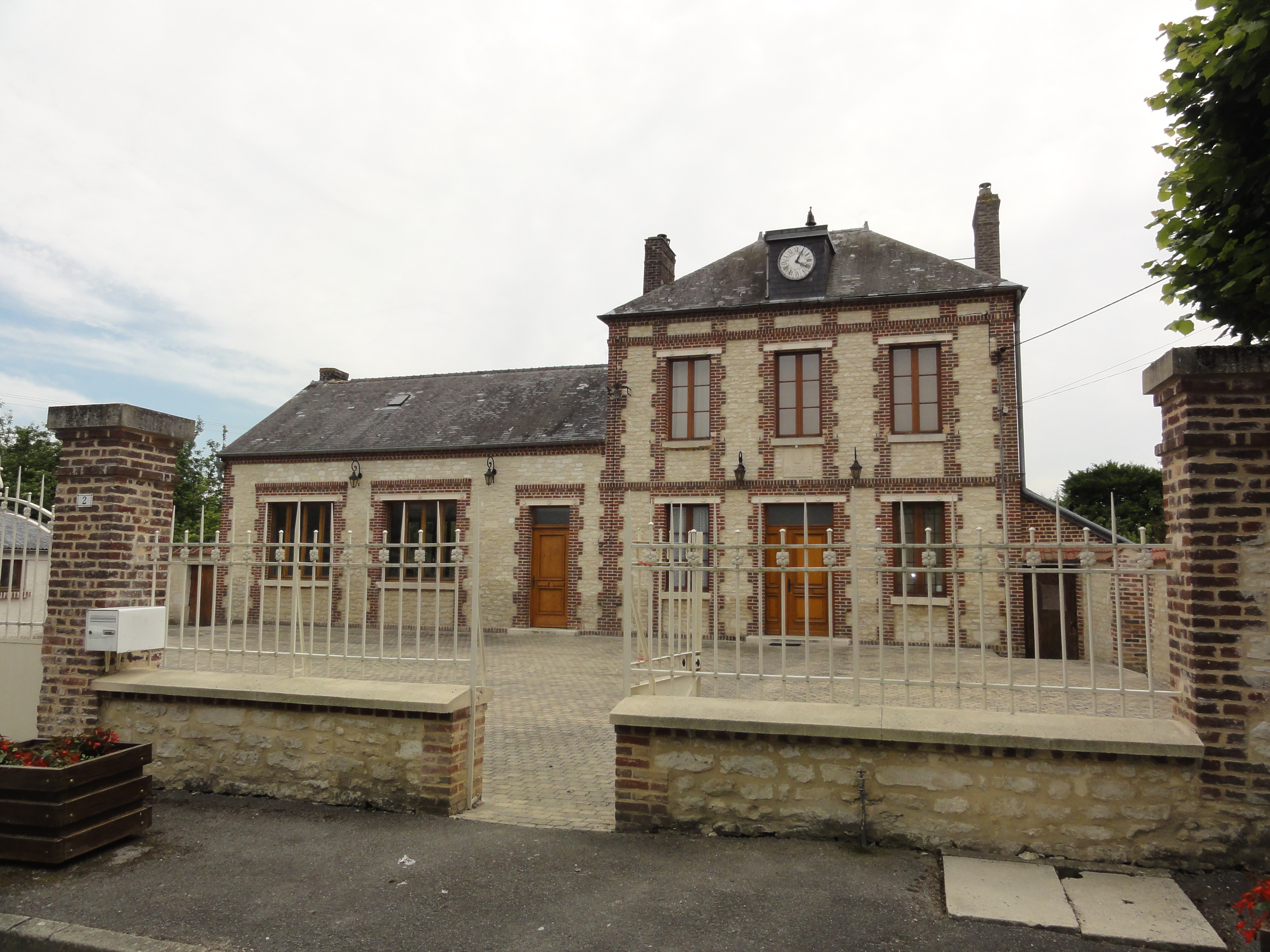
- The town hall of Sainte-Preuve
- Location of Sainte-Preuve
- Location within France Location within Hauts-de-France
- Coordinates: 49°37′11″N 3°54′27″E
- Country: France
- Region: Hauts-de-France
- Department: Aisne
- Arrondissement: Laon
- Canton: Villeneuve-sur-Aisne
- Intercommunality: Champagne Picarde

Government
  - Mayor (2026–32): Nathalie Degremont
- Area^{1}: 9.61 km^{2} (3.71 sq mi)
- Elevation: 115 m (377 ft)
- Highest elevation: 124 m (407 ft)
- Lowest elevation: 76 m (249 ft)
- Population (2023): 67
  - Density: 7.0/km^{2} (18/sq mi)
- Time zone: UTC+01:00 (CET)
  - Summer (DST): UTC+02:00 (CEST)
- INSEE/Postal code: 02690 /02350
- ^{1} French Land Register data, which excludes lakes, ponds, glaciers > 1 km^{2} (0.386 sq mi or 247 acres) and river estuaries.

Sainte-Preuve is a commune in the Aisne department in Hauts-de-France in northern France.

== Population ==
Historical population
Year	Pop.	±% p.a.
1968	97	—
1975	79	−2.89%
1982	64	−2.96%
1990	75	+2.00%
1999	85	+1.40%
2007	88	+0.43%
2012	83	−1.16%
2017	82	−0.24%
2023	67	−3.31%
Source: INSEE

== See also ==
- Communes of the Aisne department
