= Mâchecourt =

- Commune
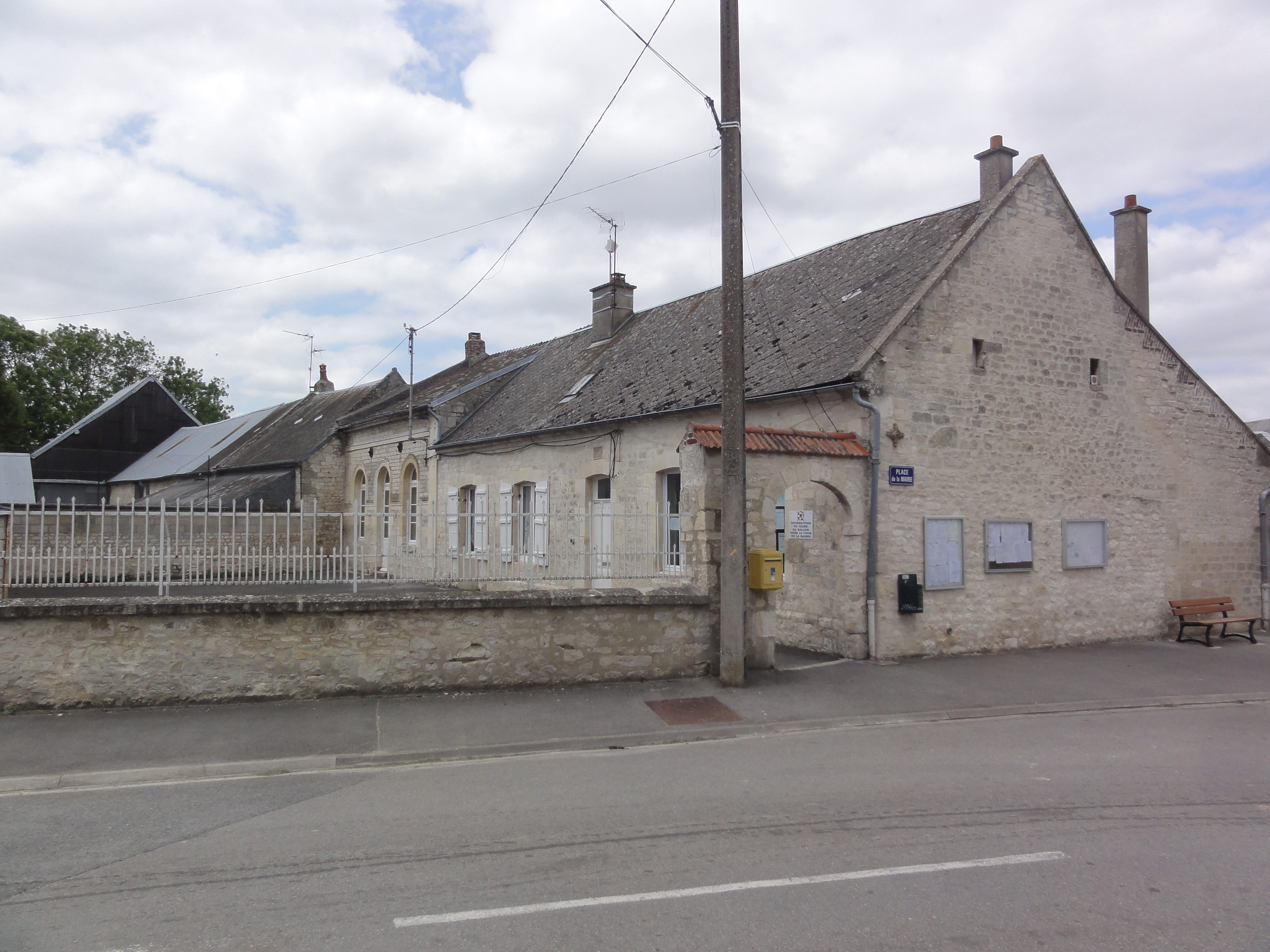
- The town hall of Mâchecourt
- Location of Mâchecourt
- Location within France Location within Hauts-de-France
- Coordinates: 49°39′17″N 3°50′30″E
- Country: France
- Region: Hauts-de-France
- Department: Aisne
- Arrondissement: Laon
- Canton: Villeneuve-sur-Aisne
- Intercommunality: Champagne Picarde

Government
  - Mayor (2026–32): Patrick Rassin
- Area^{1}: 10.08 km^{2} (3.89 sq mi)
- Elevation: 82 m (269 ft)
- Highest elevation: 103 m (338 ft)
- Lowest elevation: 67 m (220 ft)
- Population (2023): 108
  - Density: 10.7/km^{2} (27.7/sq mi)
- Time zone: UTC+01:00 (CET)
  - Summer (DST): UTC+02:00 (CEST)
- INSEE/Postal code: 02448 /02350
- ^{1} French Land Register data, which excludes lakes, ponds, glaciers > 1 km^{2} (0.386 sq mi or 247 acres) and river estuaries.

Mâchecourt (French pronunciation: [maʃkuʁ]) is a commune in the Aisne department in Hauts-de-France in northern France.

== Population ==
Historical population
Year	Pop.	±% p.a.
1968	159	—
1975	118	−4.17%
1982	105	−1.65%
1990	105	+0.00%
1999	122	+1.68%
2007	142	+1.92%
2012	116	−3.96%
2017	122	+1.01%
2023	108	−2.01%
Source: INSEE

== See also ==
- Communes of the Aisne department
