= Lappion =

- Commune
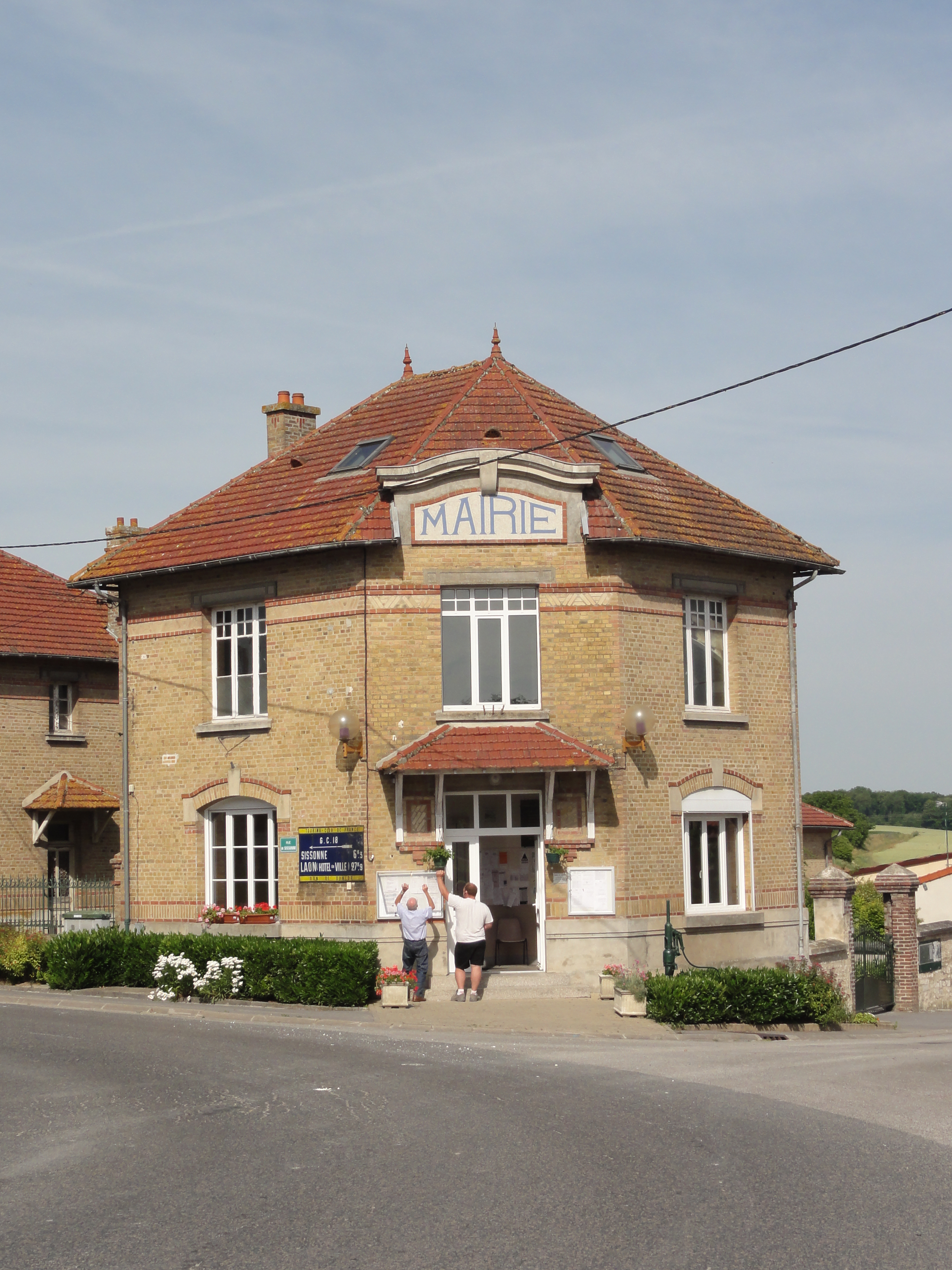
- The town hall of Lappion

- Coat of arms
- Location of Lappion
- Location within France Location within Hauts-de-France
- Coordinates: 49°36′29″N 3°57′50″E
- Country: France
- Region: Hauts-de-France
- Department: Aisne
- Arrondissement: Laon
- Canton: Villeneuve-sur-Aisne
- Intercommunality: Champagne Picarde

Government
  - Mayor (2026–32): Pierre-Marie Lebée
- Area^{1}: 23.71 km^{2} (9.15 sq mi)
- Elevation: 96 m (315 ft)
- Highest elevation: 134 m (440 ft)
- Lowest elevation: 82 m (269 ft)
- Population (2023): 283
  - Density: 11.9/km^{2} (30.9/sq mi)
- Time zone: UTC+01:00 (CET)
  - Summer (DST): UTC+02:00 (CEST)
- INSEE/Postal code: 02409 /02150
- ^{1} French Land Register data, which excludes lakes, ponds, glaciers > 1 km^{2} (0.386 sq mi or 247 acres) and river estuaries.

Lappion (French pronunciation: [lapjɔ̃]) is a commune in the Aisne department in Hauts-de-France in northern France.

== Population ==
Historical population
Year	Pop.	±% p.a.
1968	337	—
1975	266	−3.32%
1982	226	−2.30%
1990	252	+1.37%
1999	292	+1.65%
2007	289	−0.13%
2012	299	+0.68%
2017	268	−2.17%
2023	283	+0.91%
Source: INSEE

== See also ==
- Communes of the Aisne department
