= Courtrizy-et-Fussigny =

- Commune
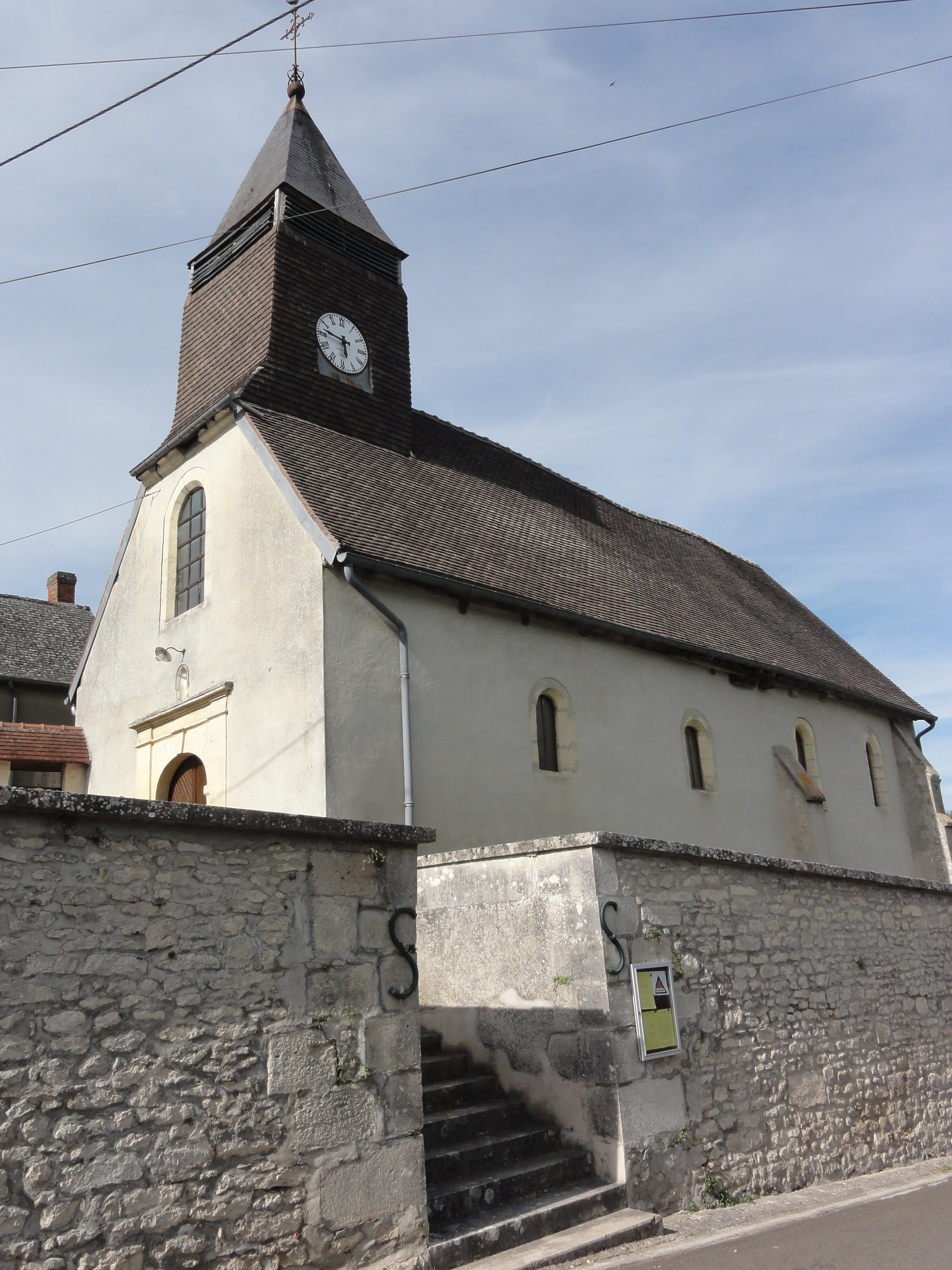
- The church of Courtrizy-et-Fussigny
- Location of Courtrizy-et-Fussigny
- Location within France Location within Hauts-de-France
- Coordinates: 49°31′15″N 3°47′20″E
- Country: France
- Region: Hauts-de-France
- Department: Aisne
- Arrondissement: Laon
- Canton: Villeneuve-sur-Aisne
- Intercommunality: Champagne Picarde

Government
  - Mayor (2026–32): Gilles Leroy
- Area^{1}: 4.22 km^{2} (1.63 sq mi)
- Elevation: 190 m (620 ft)
- Highest elevation: 205 m (673 ft)
- Lowest elevation: 107 m (351 ft)
- Population (2023): 78
  - Density: 18/km^{2} (48/sq mi)
- Time zone: UTC+01:00 (CET)
  - Summer (DST): UTC+02:00 (CEST)
- INSEE/Postal code: 02229 /02820
- ^{1} French Land Register data, which excludes lakes, ponds, glaciers > 1 km^{2} (0.386 sq mi or 247 acres) and river estuaries.

Courtrizy-et-Fussigny is a commune in the Aisne department in Hauts-de-France in northern France.

== Population ==
Historical population
Year	Pop.	±% p.a.
1968	68	—
1975	49	−4.57%
1982	63	+3.66%
1990	58	−1.03%
1999	66	+1.45%
2007	75	+1.61%
2012	62	−3.74%
2017	66	+1.26%
2023	78	+2.82%
Source: INSEE

== See also ==
- Communes of the Aisne department
