= Goudelancourt-lès-Berrieux =

- Commune
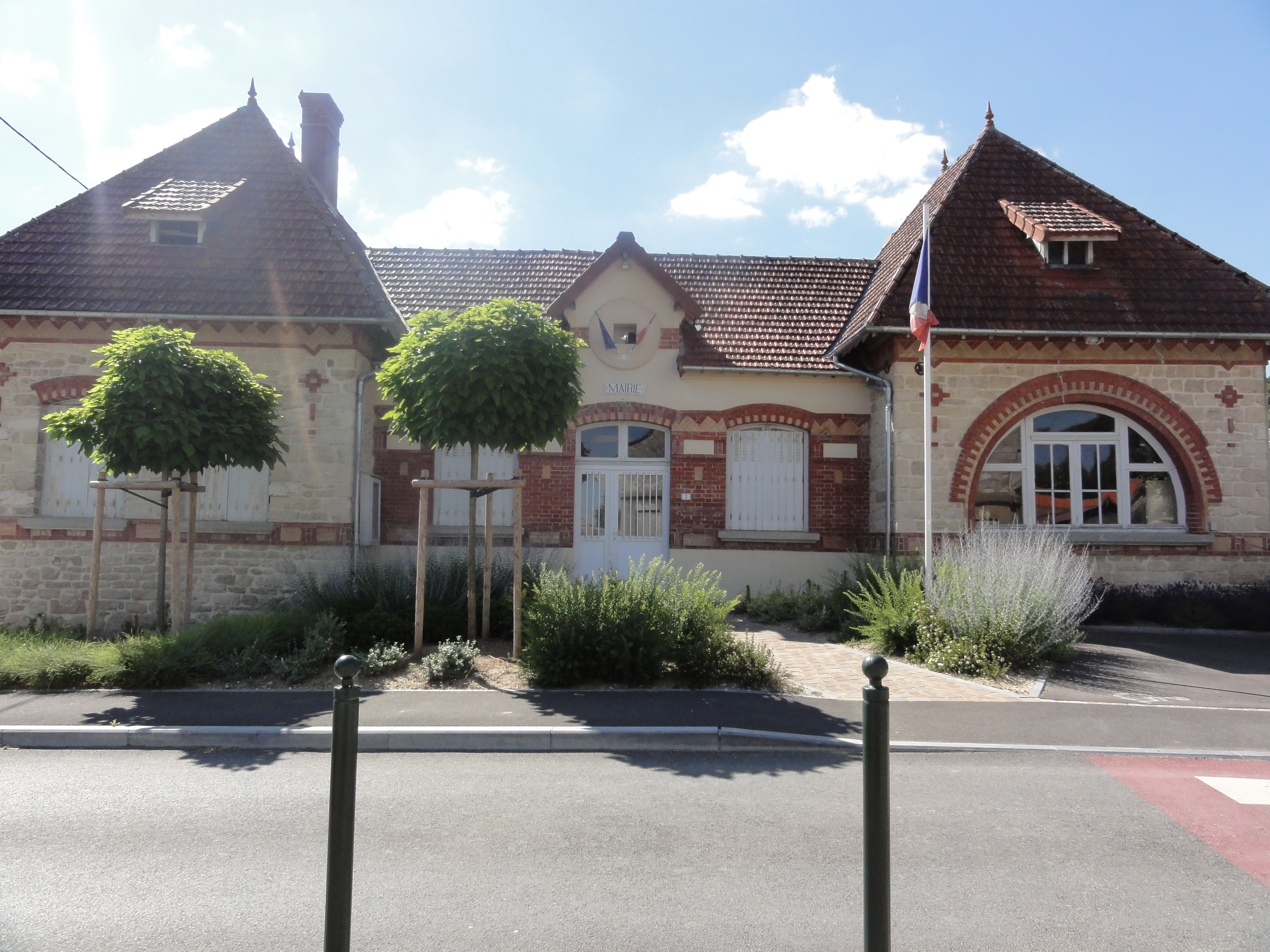
- The town hall of Goudelancourt-lès-Berrieux
- Location of Goudelancourt-lès-Berrieux
- Location within France Location within Hauts-de-France
- Coordinates: 49°29′51″N 3°51′00″E
- Country: France
- Region: Hauts-de-France
- Department: Aisne
- Arrondissement: Laon
- Canton: Villeneuve-sur-Aisne
- Intercommunality: Chemin des Dames

Government
  - Mayor (2026–32): Sonia Gurhem
- Area^{1}: 5.54 km^{2} (2.14 sq mi)
- Elevation: 107 m (351 ft)
- Highest elevation: 200 m (660 ft)
- Lowest elevation: 72 m (236 ft)
- Population (2023): 65
  - Density: 12/km^{2} (30/sq mi)
- Time zone: UTC+01:00 (CET)
  - Summer (DST): UTC+02:00 (CEST)
- INSEE/Postal code: 02349 /02820
- ^{1} French Land Register data, which excludes lakes, ponds, glaciers > 1 km^{2} (0.386 sq mi or 247 acres) and river estuaries.

Goudelancourt-lès-Berrieux is a commune in the Aisne department in Hauts-de-France in northern France.

== Population ==
Historical population
Year	Pop.	±% p.a.
1968	64	—
1975	70	+1.29%
1982	55	−3.39%
1990	65	+2.11%
1999	74	+1.45%
2007	72	−0.34%
2012	54	−5.59%
2017	57	+1.09%
2023	65	+2.21%
Source: INSEE

== See also ==
- Communes of the Aisne department
