= Ébouleau =

- Commune
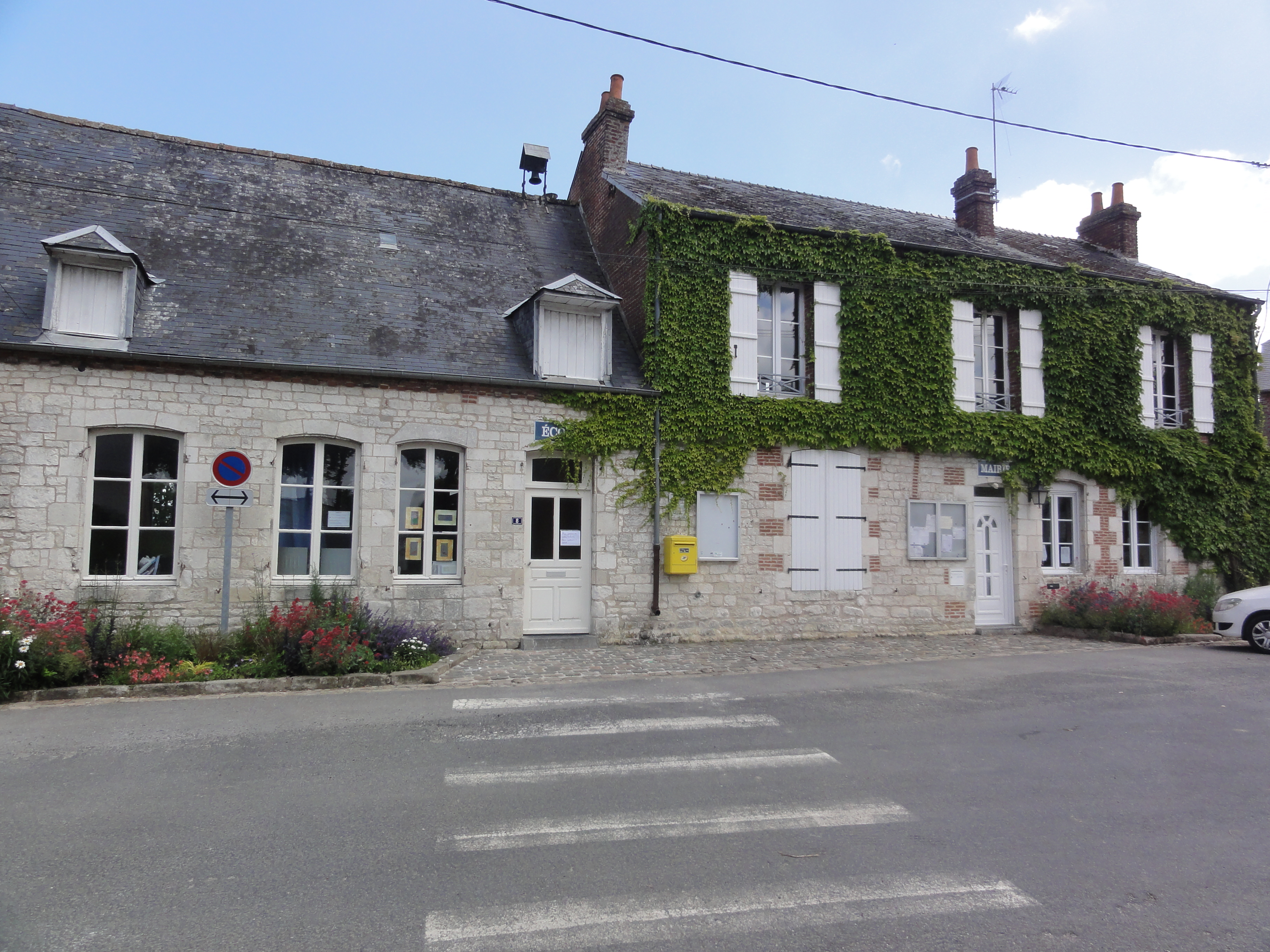
- The town hall of Ébouleau
- Location of Ébouleau
- Location within France Location within Hauts-de-France
- Coordinates: 49°40′26″N 3°52′32″E
- Country: France
- Region: Hauts-de-France
- Department: Aisne
- Arrondissement: Laon
- Canton: Villeneuve-sur-Aisne
- Intercommunality: Champagne Picarde

Government
  - Mayor (2026–32): Urbain Van Den Avenne
- Area^{1}: 13.03 km^{2} (5.03 sq mi)
- Elevation: 104 m (341 ft)
- Highest elevation: 139 m (456 ft)
- Lowest elevation: 87 m (285 ft)
- Population (2023): 164
  - Density: 12.6/km^{2} (32.6/sq mi)
- Time zone: UTC+01:00 (CET)
  - Summer (DST): UTC+02:00 (CEST)
- INSEE/Postal code: 02274 /02350
- ^{1} French Land Register data, which excludes lakes, ponds, glaciers > 1 km^{2} (0.386 sq mi or 247 acres) and river estuaries.

Ébouleau (French pronunciation: [ebulo]) is a commune in the Aisne department in Hauts-de-France in northern France.

== Population ==
Historical population
| Year | Pop. | ±% p.a. |
|---|---|---|
| 1968 | 221 | — |
| 1975 | 177 | −3.12% |
| 1982 | 204 | +2.05% |
| 1990 | 209 | +0.30% |
| 1999 | 203 | −0.32% |
| 2007 | 202 | −0.06% |
| 2012 | 214 | +1.16% |
| 2017 | 200 | −1.34% |
| 2023 | 164 | −3.25% |
Source: INSEE

== See also ==
- Communes of the Aisne department
