= Mauregny-en-Haye =

- Commune
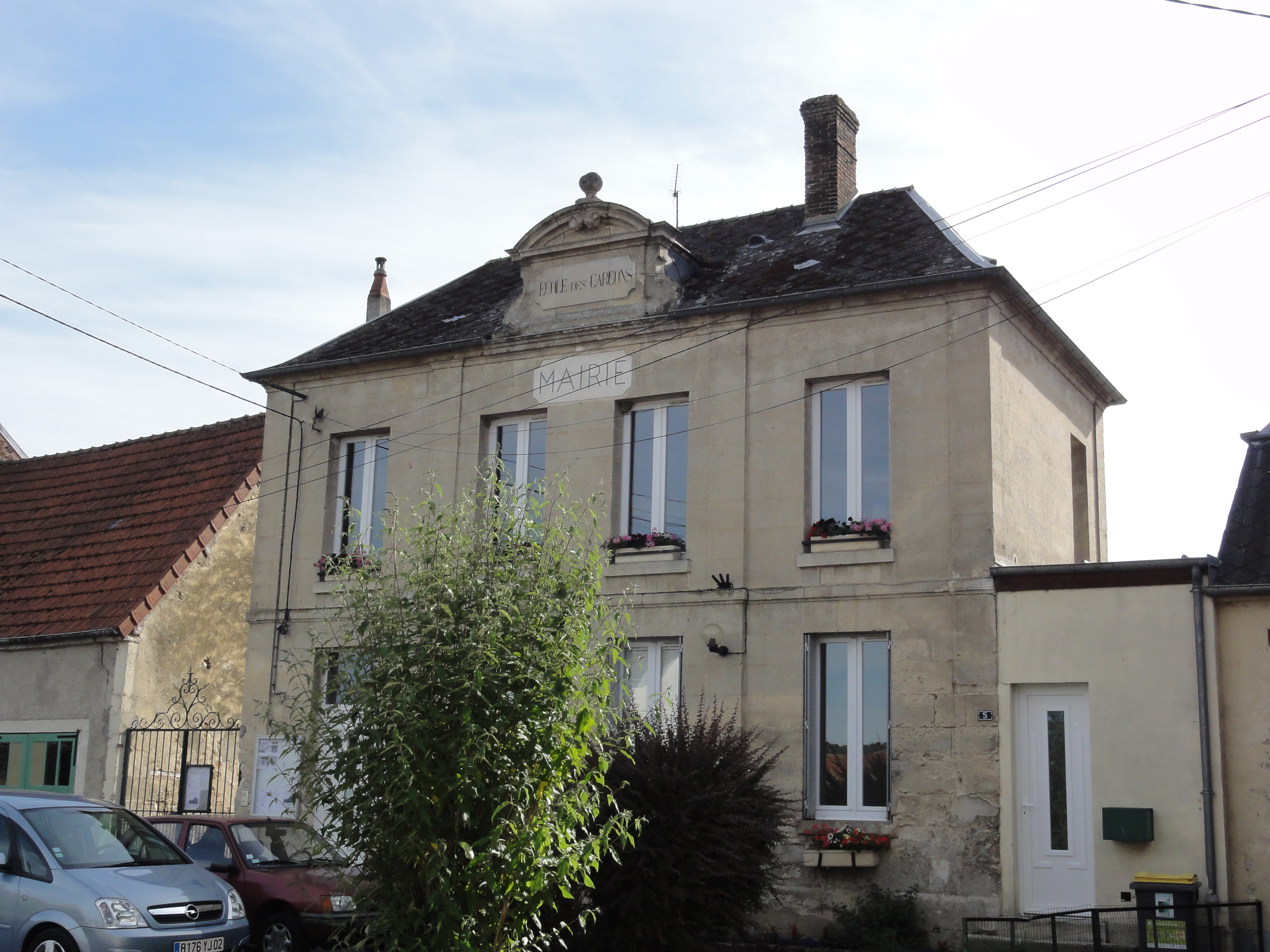
- The town hall and school of Mauregny-en-Haye
- Location of Mauregny-en-Haye
- Location within France Location within Hauts-de-France
- Coordinates: 49°31′51″N 3°47′40″E
- Country: France
- Region: Hauts-de-France
- Department: Aisne
- Arrondissement: Laon
- Canton: Villeneuve-sur-Aisne
- Intercommunality: Champagne Picarde

Government
  - Mayor (2026–32): Laurent Allart
- Area^{1}: 10.46 km^{2} (4.04 sq mi)
- Elevation: 78 m (256 ft)
- Highest elevation: 200 m (660 ft)
- Lowest elevation: 79 m (259 ft)
- Population (2023): 398
  - Density: 38.0/km^{2} (98.5/sq mi)
- Time zone: UTC+01:00 (CET)
  - Summer (DST): UTC+02:00 (CEST)
- INSEE/Postal code: 02472 /02820
- ^{1} French Land Register data, which excludes lakes, ponds, glaciers > 1 km^{2} (0.386 sq mi or 247 acres) and river estuaries.

Mauregny-en-Haye is a commune in the Aisne department in Hauts-de-France in northern France.

== Population ==
Historical population
Year	Pop.	±% p.a.
1968	416	—
1975	419	+0.10%
1982	411	−0.28%
1990	420	+0.27%
1999	420	+0.00%
2007	411	−0.27%
2012	452	+1.92%
2017	420	−1.46%
2023	398	−0.89%
Source: INSEE

== See also ==
- Communes of the Aisne department
