= Assis-sur-Serre =

- Commune
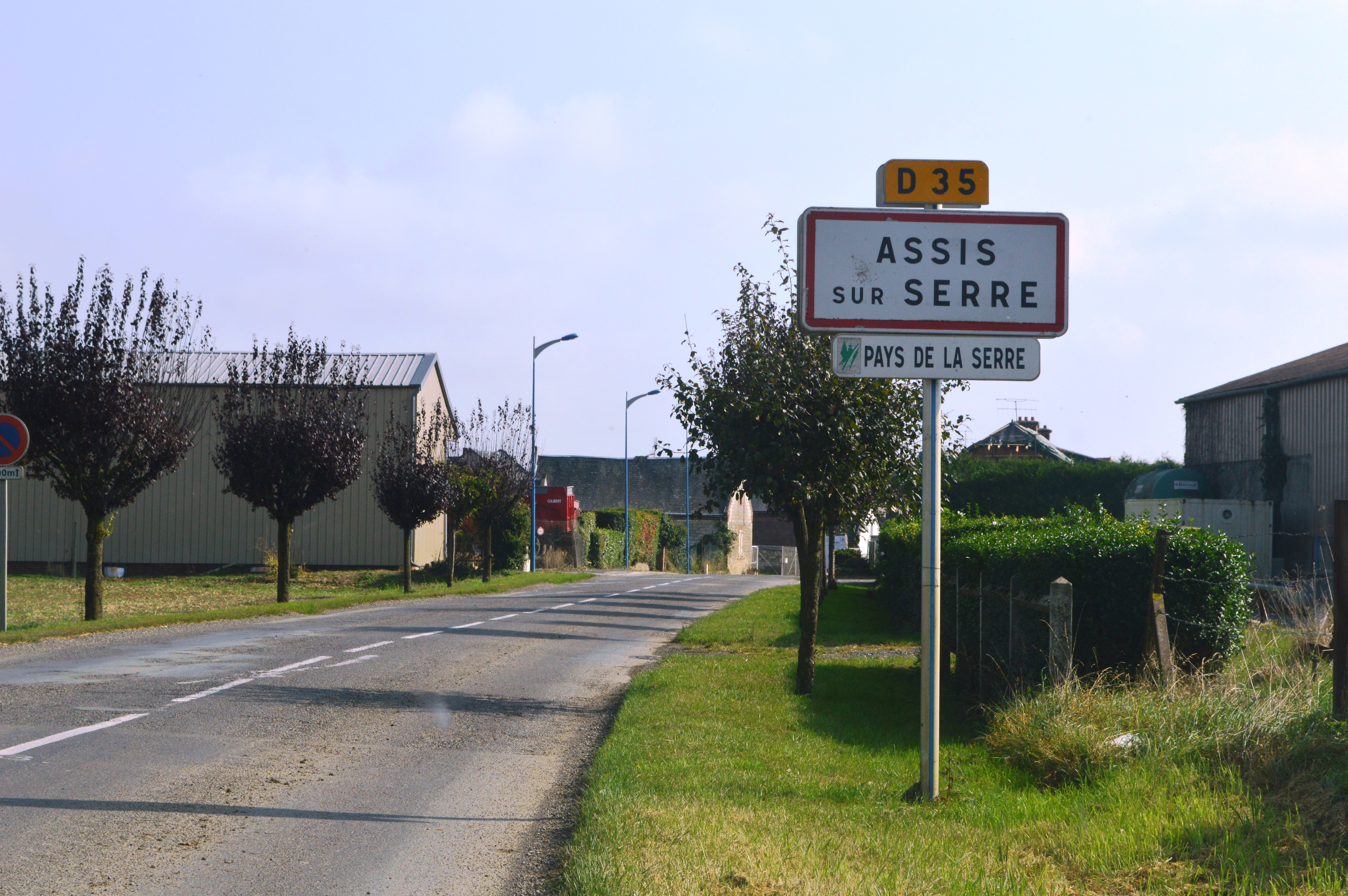
- Location of Assis-sur-Serre
- Location within France Location within Hauts-de-France
- Coordinates: 49°41′20″N 3°33′34″E
- Country: France
- Region: Hauts-de-France
- Department: Aisne
- Arrondissement: Laon
- Canton: Marle
- Intercommunality: Pays de la Serre

Government
  - Mayor (2026–32): Aurélien Parmentier
- Area^{1}: 8.04 km^{2} (3.10 sq mi)
- Elevation: 75 m (246 ft)
- Highest elevation: 90 m (300 ft)
- Lowest elevation: 56 m (184 ft)
- Population (2023): 209
  - Density: 26.0/km^{2} (67.3/sq mi)
- Time zone: UTC+01:00 (CET)
  - Summer (DST): UTC+02:00 (CEST)
- INSEE/Postal code: 02027 /02270
- ^{1} French Land Register data, which excludes lakes, ponds, glaciers > 1 km^{2} (0.386 sq mi or 247 acres) and river estuaries.

Assis-sur-Serre is a commune in the department of Aisne in the Hauts-de-France region of northern France.

== Geography ==
Assis-sur-Serre is located 30 km southeast of Saint-Quentin and 15 km northwest of Laon. It is accessible by the D35 road from Remies in the west through the center of the commune and the village and continuing along Pouilly-sur-Serre in the east. Additionally, the D351 road travels north from the village, linking to the D642 that proceeds north to Montigny-sur-Crecy. The commune, which is all agricultural preserve for the development, features a network of country roads.

The Serre commune's northern border is established by a river that travels through it, but apart from a small loop off the Serre, there are no other rivers within the commune.

== Population ==
Historical population
Year	Pop.	±% p.a.
1968	308	—
1975	291	−0.81%
1982	244	−2.49%
1990	257	+0.65%
1999	266	+0.38%
2007	257	−0.43%
2012	264	+0.54%
2017	222	−3.41%
2023	209	−1.00%
Source: INSEE

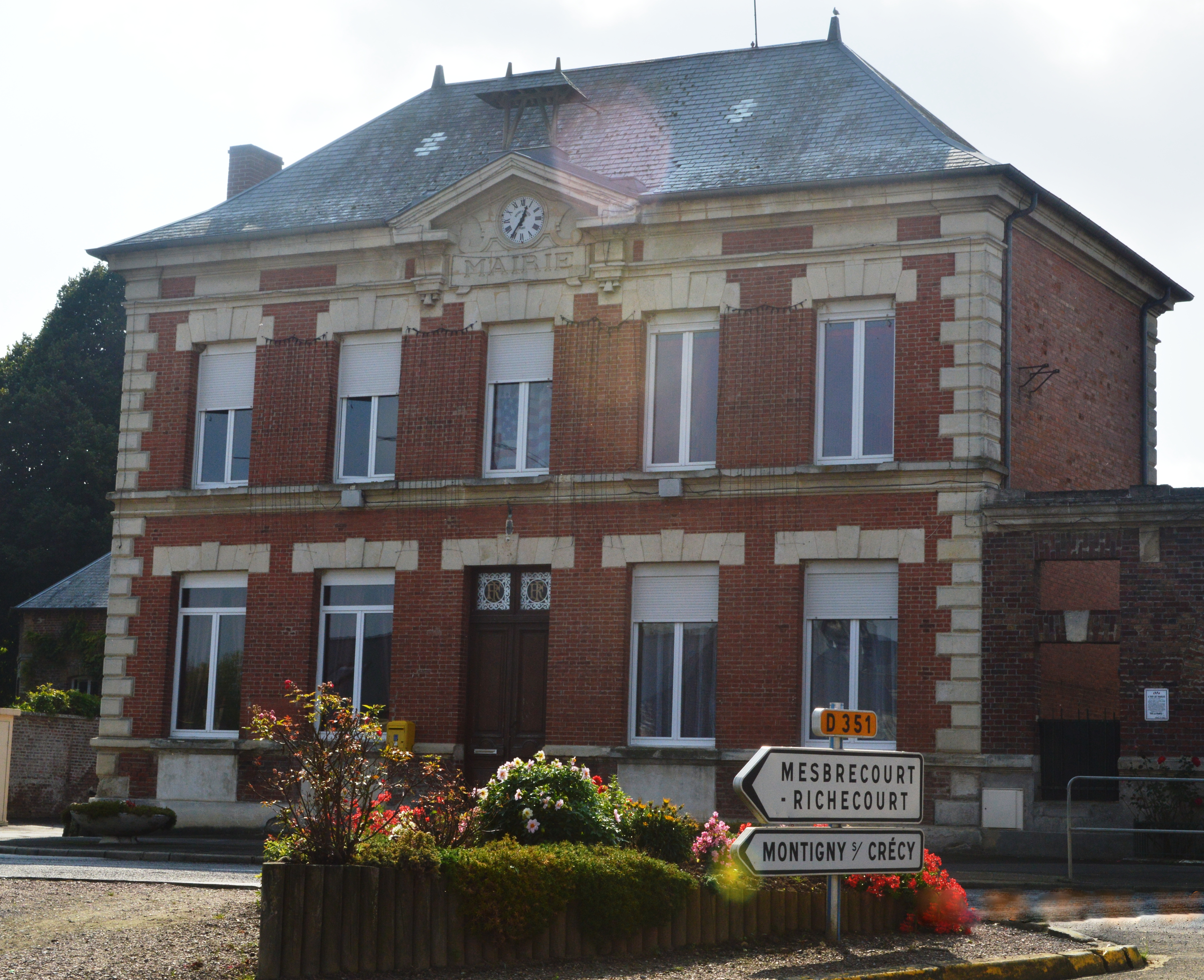
The Town Hall

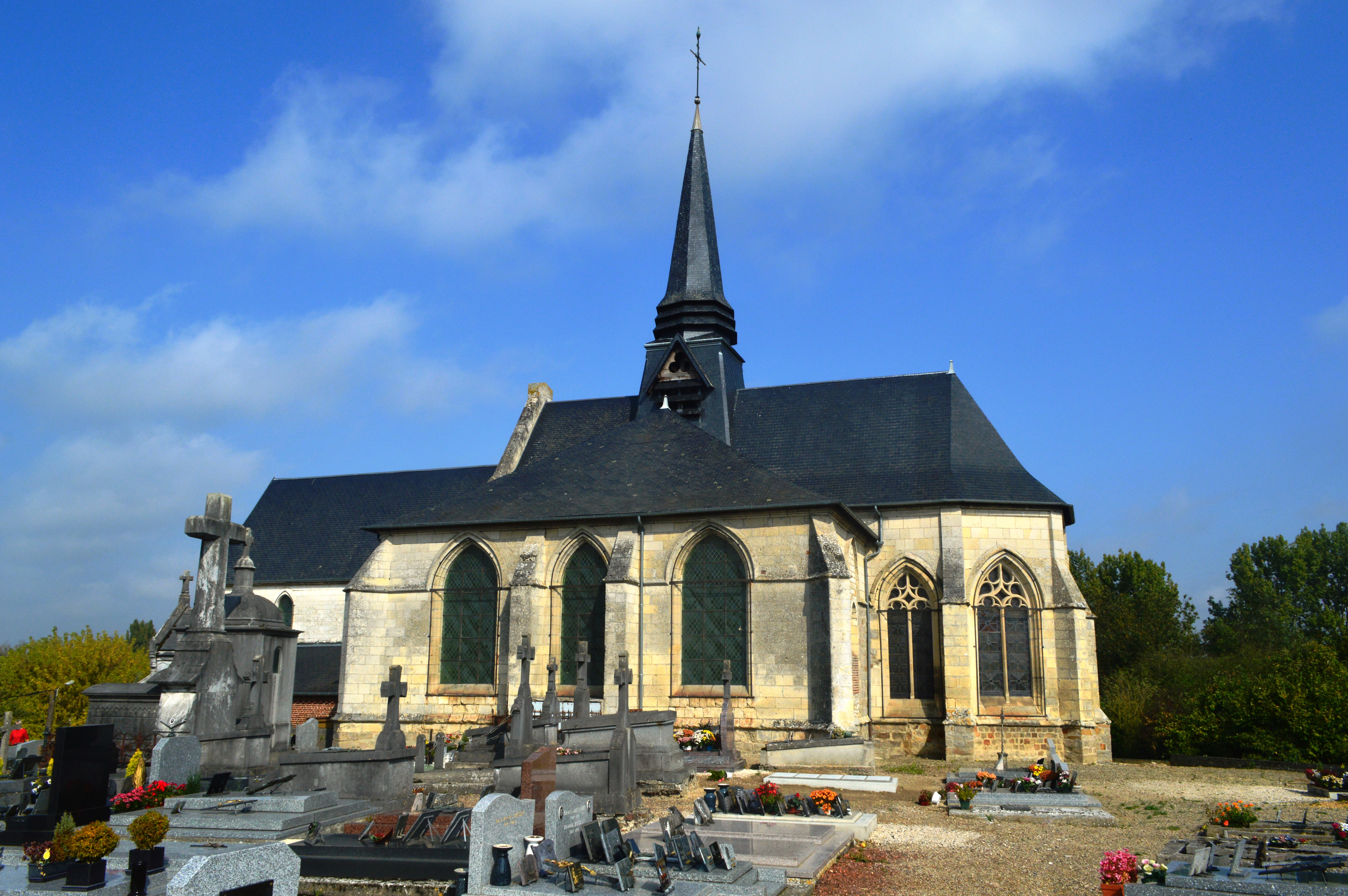
Assis-sur-Serre Church

== Sites and Monuments ==
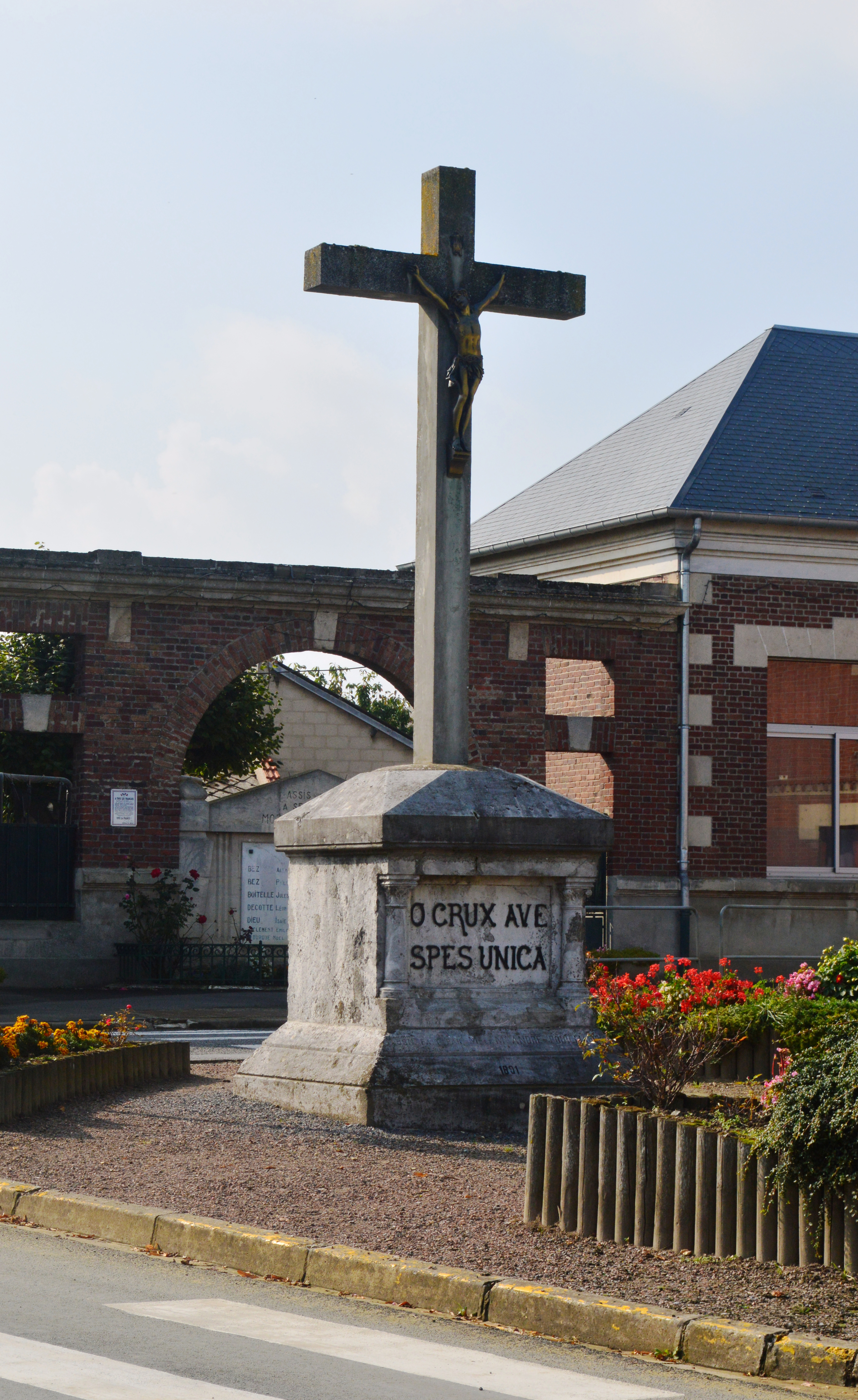
The Calvary in Assis-sur-Serre

- A Calvary in the middle of the village square.

== Notable people associated with the commune ==
- Louis Santos-Marriage, architect of the Assis-sur-Serre mill

== Facilities ==
There is a tennis court and motocross land in the village.

== See also ==
- Communes of the Aisne department
