= Barenton-sur-Serre =

- Commune
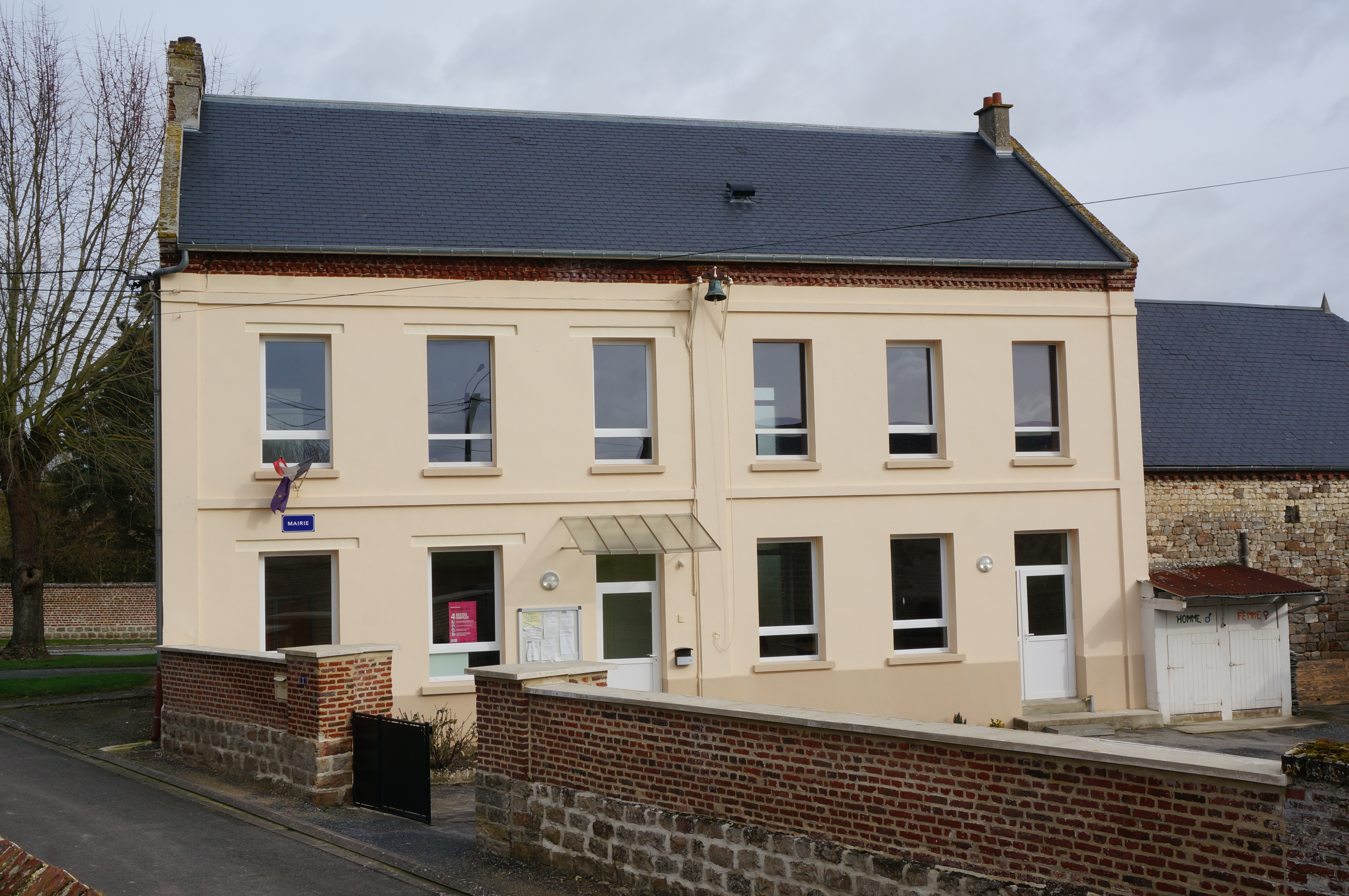
- Town hall
- Location of Barenton-sur-Serre
- Location within France Location within Hauts-de-France
- Coordinates: 49°40′20″N 3°40′52″E
- Country: France
- Region: Hauts-de-France
- Department: Aisne
- Arrondissement: Laon
- Canton: Marle
- Intercommunality: Pays de la Serre

Government
  - Mayor (2026–32): Laurent Hurier
- Area^{1}: 8.05 km^{2} (3.11 sq mi)
- Highest elevation: 122 m (400 ft)
- Lowest elevation: 61 m (200 ft)
- Population (2023): 130
  - Density: 16/km^{2} (42/sq mi)
- Time zone: UTC+01:00 (CET)
  - Summer (DST): UTC+02:00 (CEST)
- INSEE/Postal code: 02048 /02270
- ^{1} French Land Register data, which excludes lakes, ponds, glaciers > 1 km^{2} (0.386 sq mi or 247 acres) and river estuaries.

Barenton-sur-Serre (French pronunciation: [baʁɑ̃tɔ̃ syʁ sɛʁ], literally Barenton on Serre) is a commune in the department of Aisne in the Hauts-de-France region of northern France.

== Geography ==
Barenton-sur-Serre is located some 35 km southeast of Saint-Quentin and 15 km northeast of Laon. National Route N2 passes through the commune from Froidmont-Cohartille in the northeast running southwest through the commune. Access to the village is by road D3060 running west from the N2 to the village then continuing north-west to road D12. There is also access to the village on a country road from Froidmont-Cohartille. There is quite a large area of forest north of the village and in a belt extending southeast of the village. The rest of the commune is all farmland.

The Ru de Barentons flows from the south of the commune into the Souche river which flows from east to west through the commune then continues northwest to join the Serre river.

== Population ==
Historical population
Year	Pop.	±% p.a.
1968	109	—
1975	97	−1.65%
1982	112	+2.08%
1990	106	−0.69%
1999	109	+0.31%
2007	111	+0.23%
2012	118	+1.23%
2017	134	+2.58%
2023	130	−0.50%
Source: INSEE

== Gallery ==
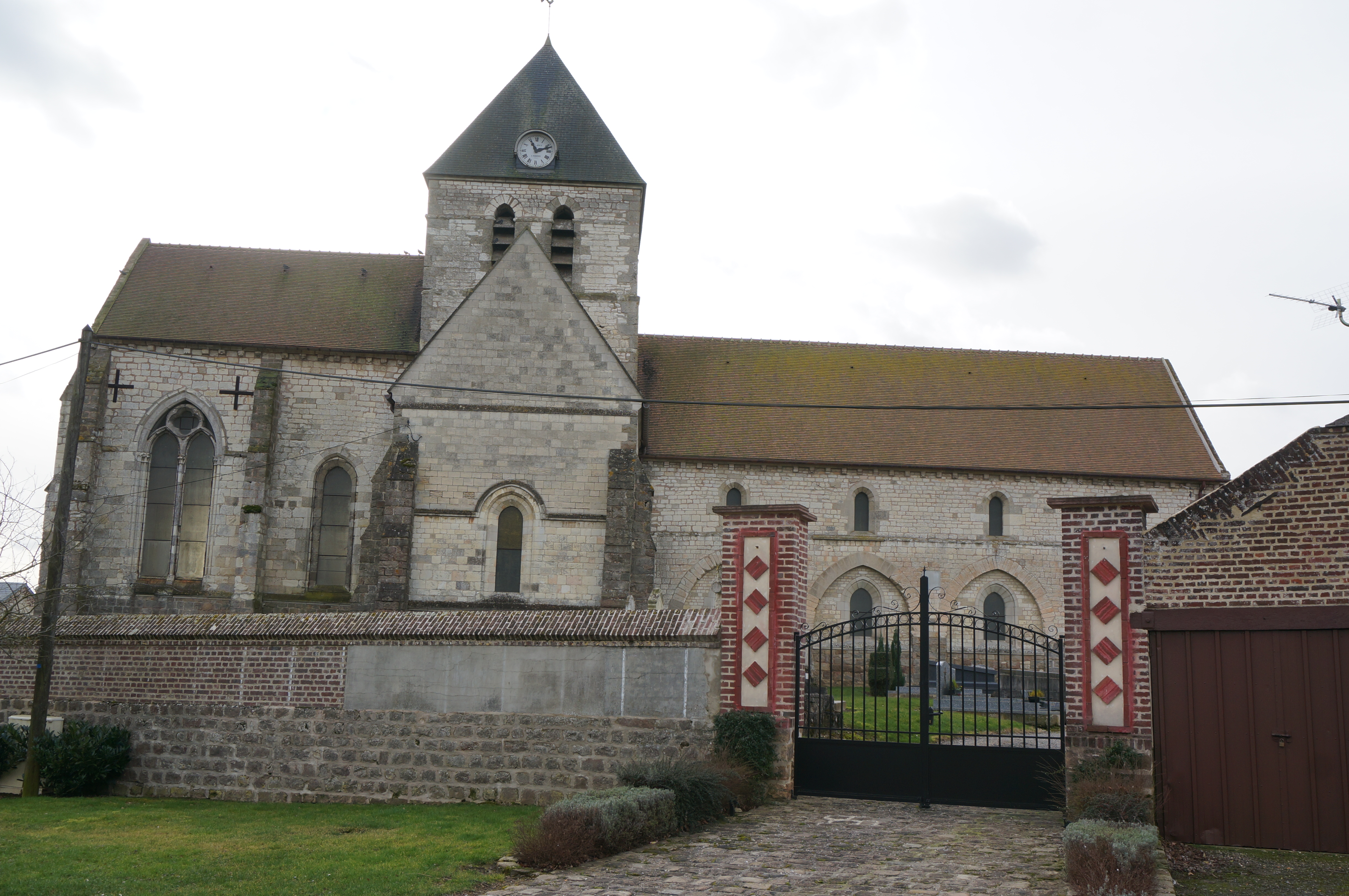
The Church

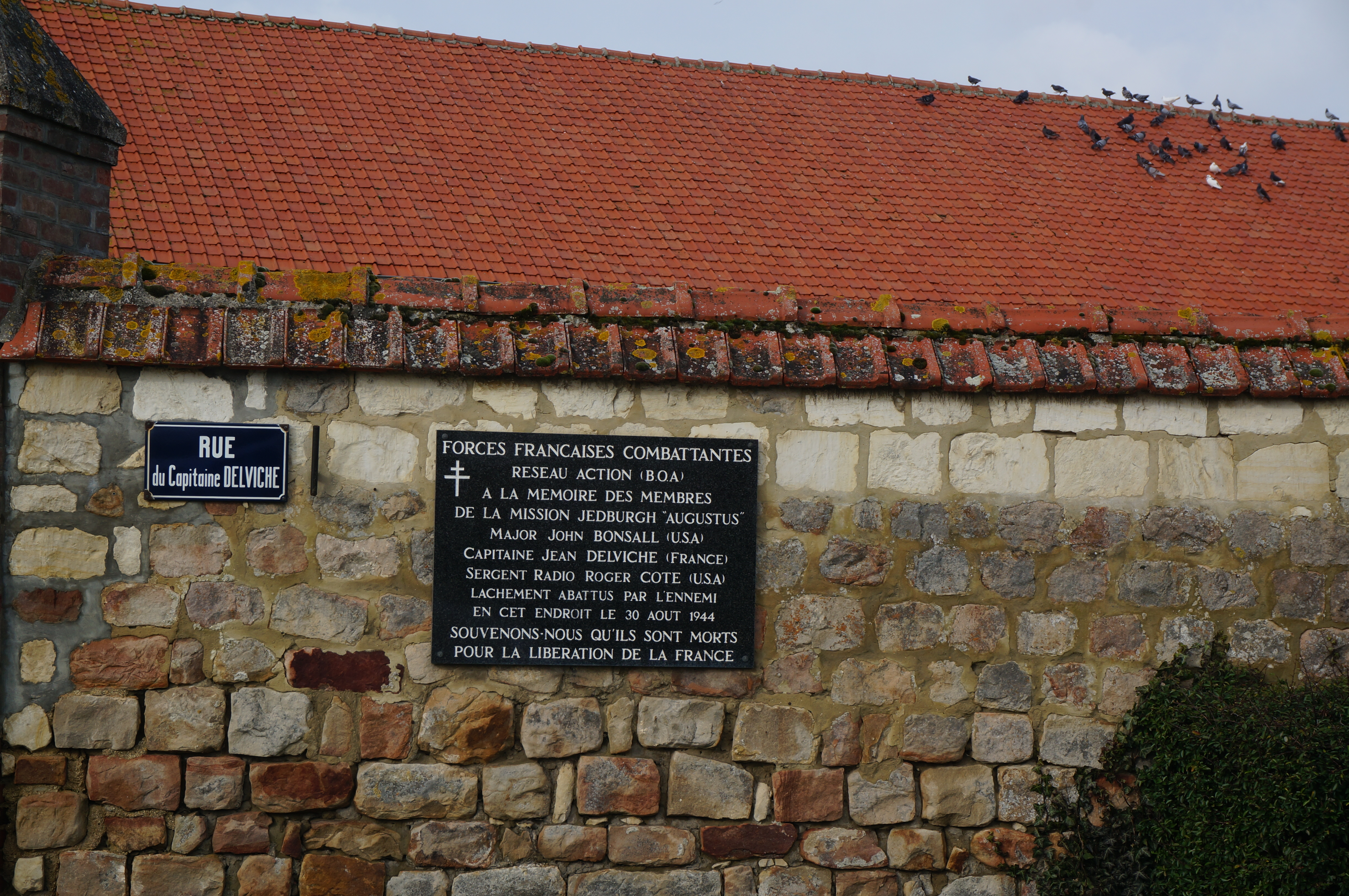
Jedburgh Augustus Memorial

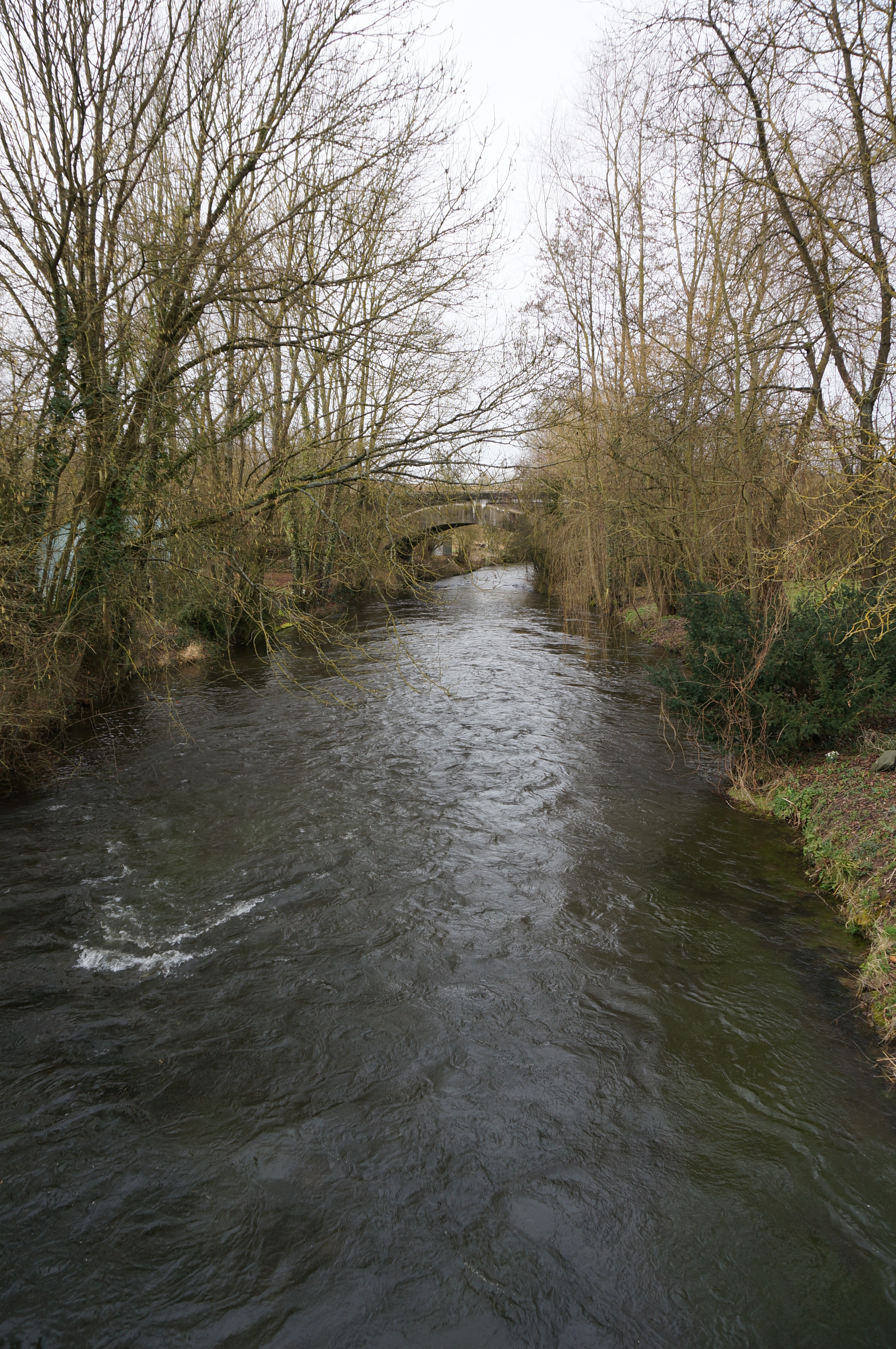
The Souche river from the bridge

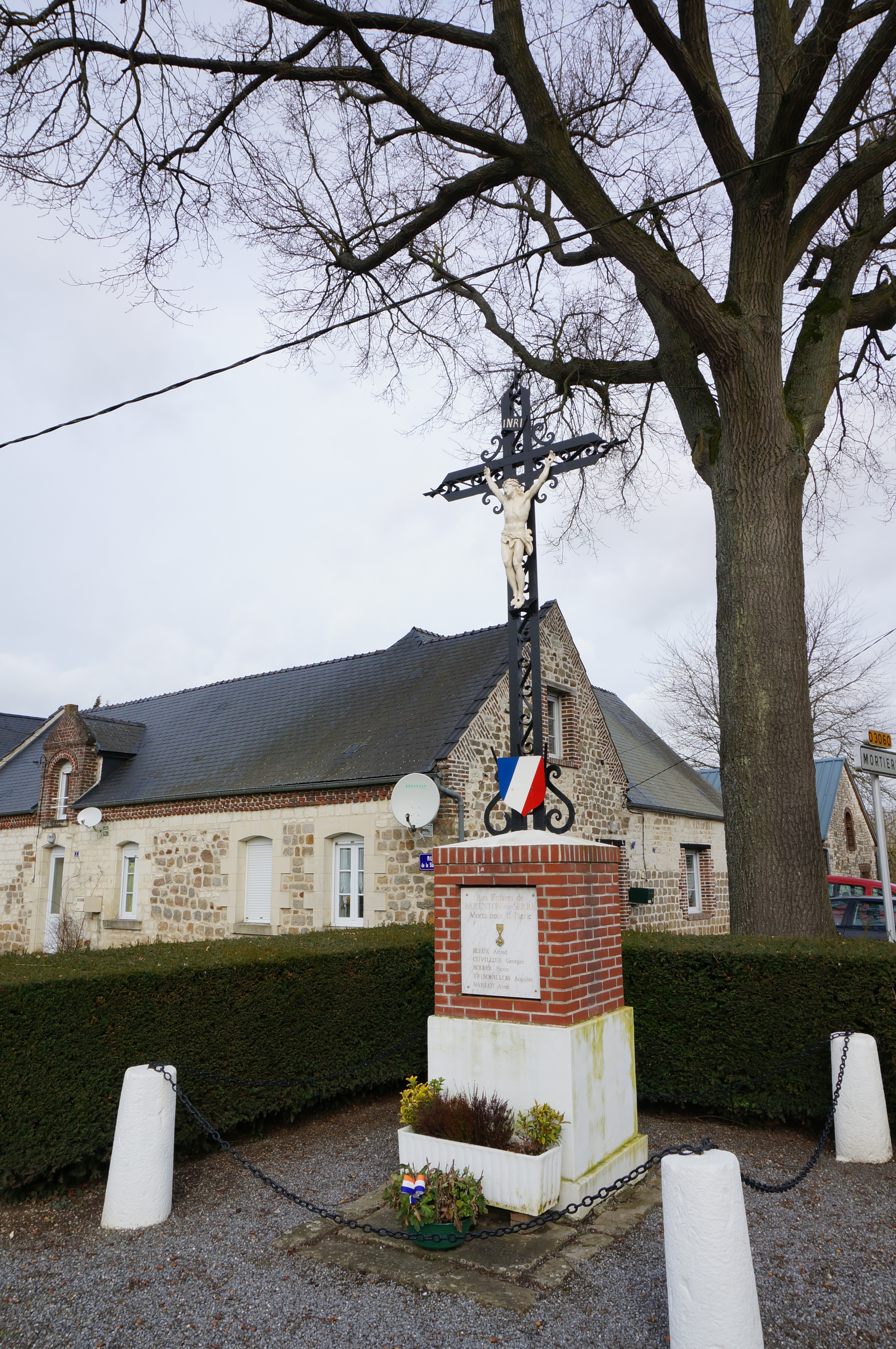
The War Memorial

== See also ==
- Communes of the Aisne department
