= Mortiers =

Mortiers may refer to the following places in France:

- Mortiers, Aisne, in the Aisne département
- Mortiers, Charente-Maritime, in the Charente-Maritime département
