= Barenton-Bugny =

- Commune
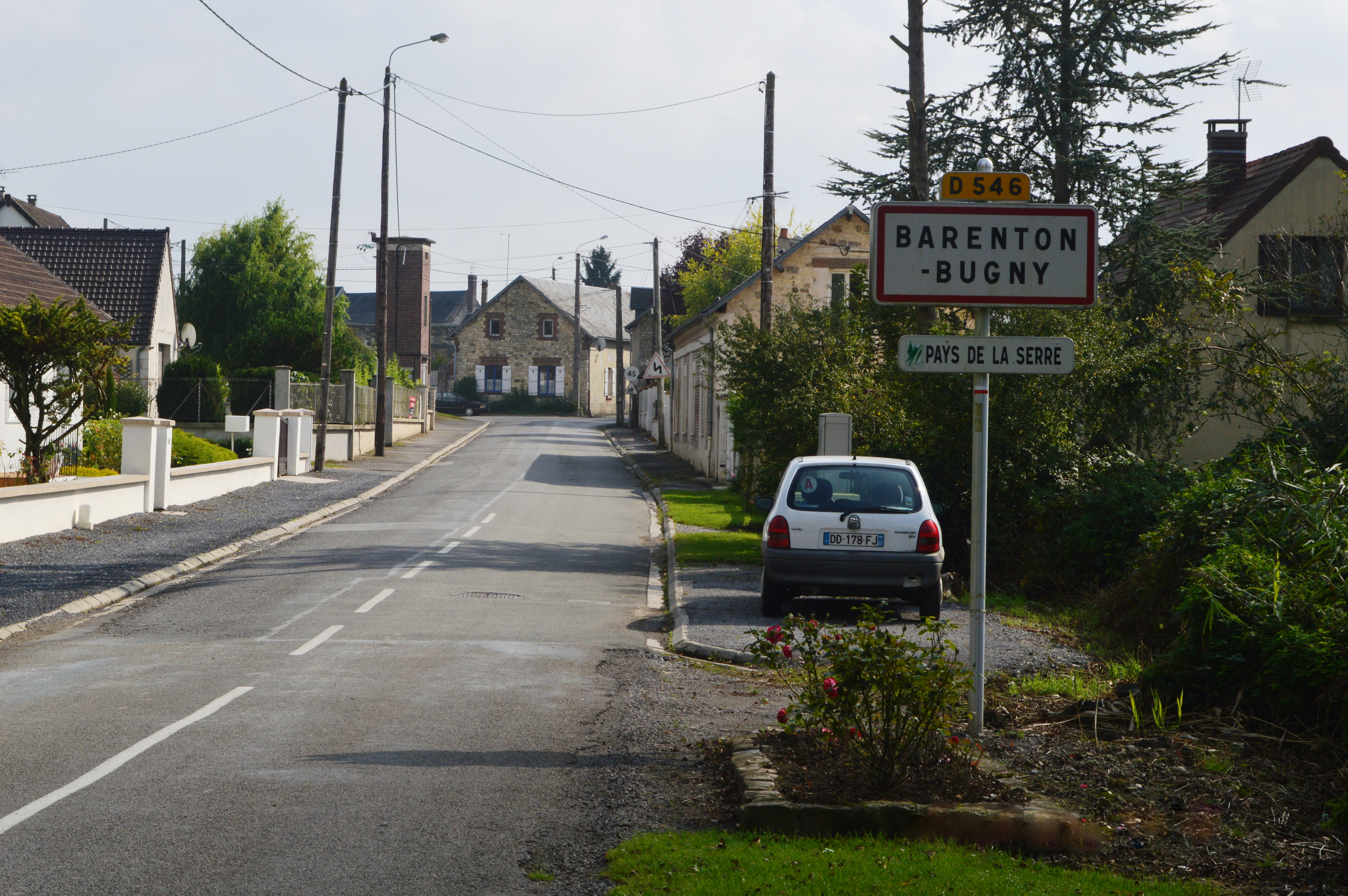
- Location of Barenton-Bugny
- Location within France Location within Hauts-de-France
- Coordinates: 49°38′02″N 3°39′08″E
- Country: France
- Region: Hauts-de-France
- Department: Aisne
- Arrondissement: Laon
- Canton: Marle
- Intercommunality: Pays de la Serre

Government
  - Mayor (2026–32): Patrick Julien
- Area^{1}: 11.38 km^{2} (4.39 sq mi)
- Highest elevation: 96 m (315 ft)
- Lowest elevation: 64 m (210 ft)
- Population (2023): 555
  - Density: 48.8/km^{2} (126/sq mi)
- Time zone: UTC+01:00 (CET)
  - Summer (DST): UTC+02:00 (CEST)
- INSEE/Postal code: 02046 /02000
- ^{1} French Land Register data, which excludes lakes, ponds, glaciers > 1 km^{2} (0.386 sq mi or 247 acres) and river estuaries.

Barenton-Bugny (French pronunciation: [baʁɑ̃tɔ̃ byɲi]) is a commune in the department of Aisne in the Hauts-de-France region of northern France.

== Geography ==
Barenton-Bugny is located some 5 km north by northwest of Laon and 8 km south of Crecy-sur-Serre. The Autoroute des Anglais (A26 autoroute) passes through the commune, and there is an exit just south of the commune to National Highway N2 which passes north-east through the commune. From National Highway N2 the commune can be accessed on road D546 going north to the village then continuing northwest to intersect the D545 going north to Barenton-Cel. The D513 also goes east from the village to Monceau-le-Waast. There is also the D967 road which passes north–south through the western edge of the commune. Apart from the village and a few patches of forest the commune is entirely farmland with no other villages or hamlets.

The northwestern border of the commune is delineated by the Ruisseau de Longedeau which flows into the Ru des Barentons and continues north changing its name a few times before joining the Souche river.

=== Neighbouring communes and villages ===
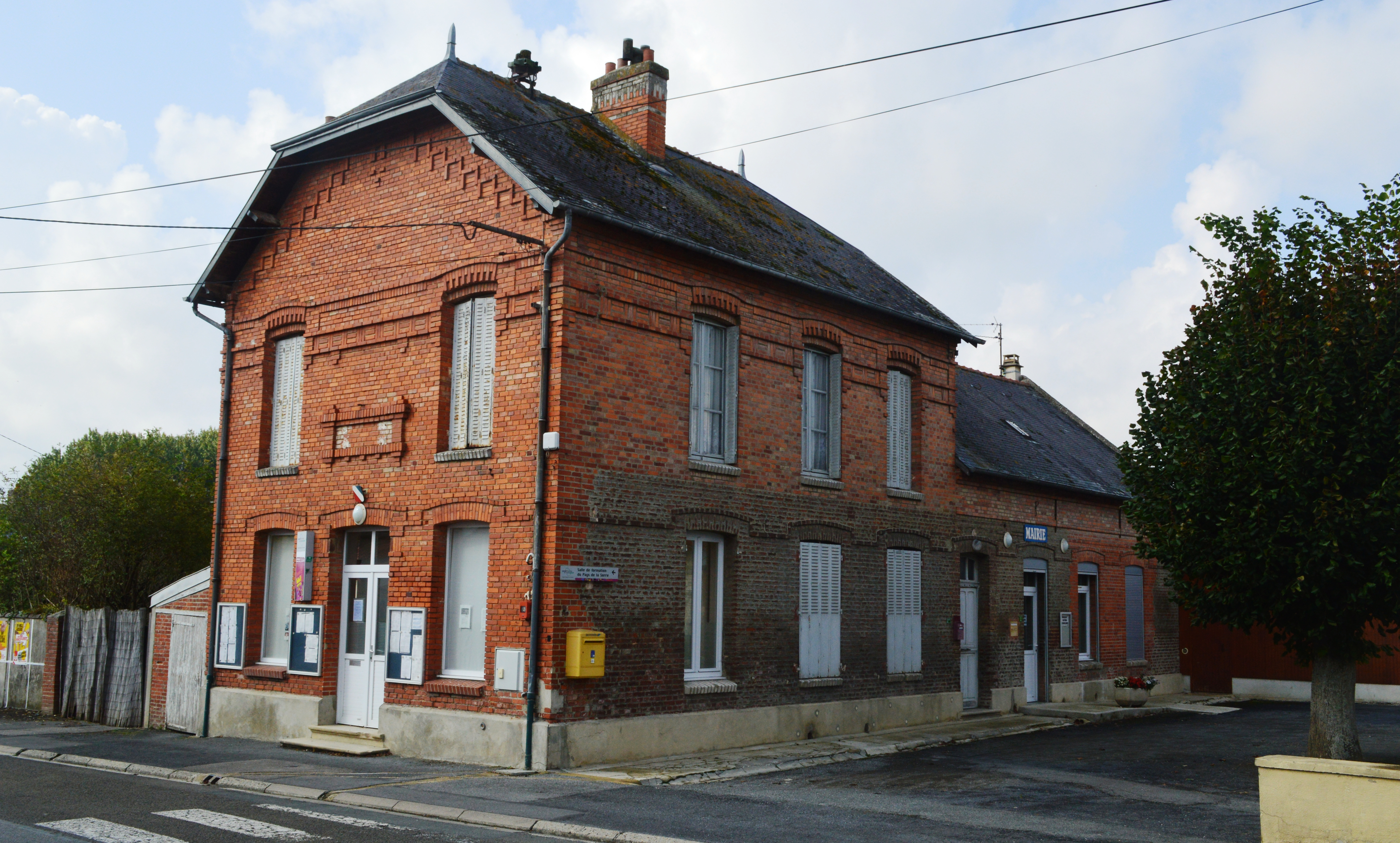
The Town Hall

== Population ==
Historical population
| Year | Pop. | ±% p.a. |
|---|---|---|
| 1968 | 519 | — |
| 1975 | 489 | −0.85% |
| 1982 | 527 | +1.07% |
| 1990 | 578 | +1.16% |
| 1999 | 533 | −0.90% |
| 2007 | 575 | +0.95% |
| 2012 | 567 | −0.28% |
| 2017 | 555 | −0.43% |
| 2023 | 555 | +0.00% |
Source: INSEE

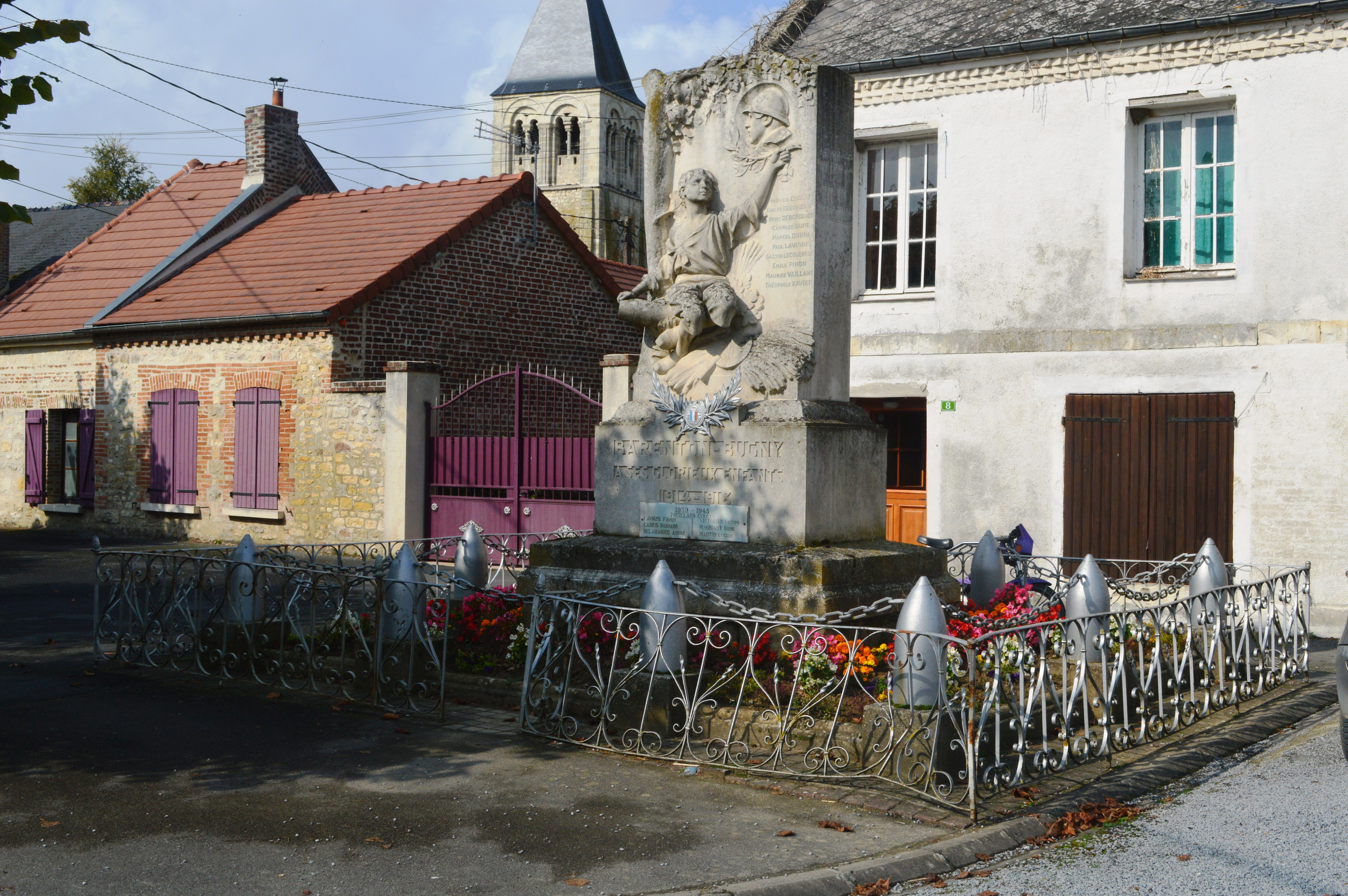
Barenton-Bugny War Memorial

== Sites and Monuments ==
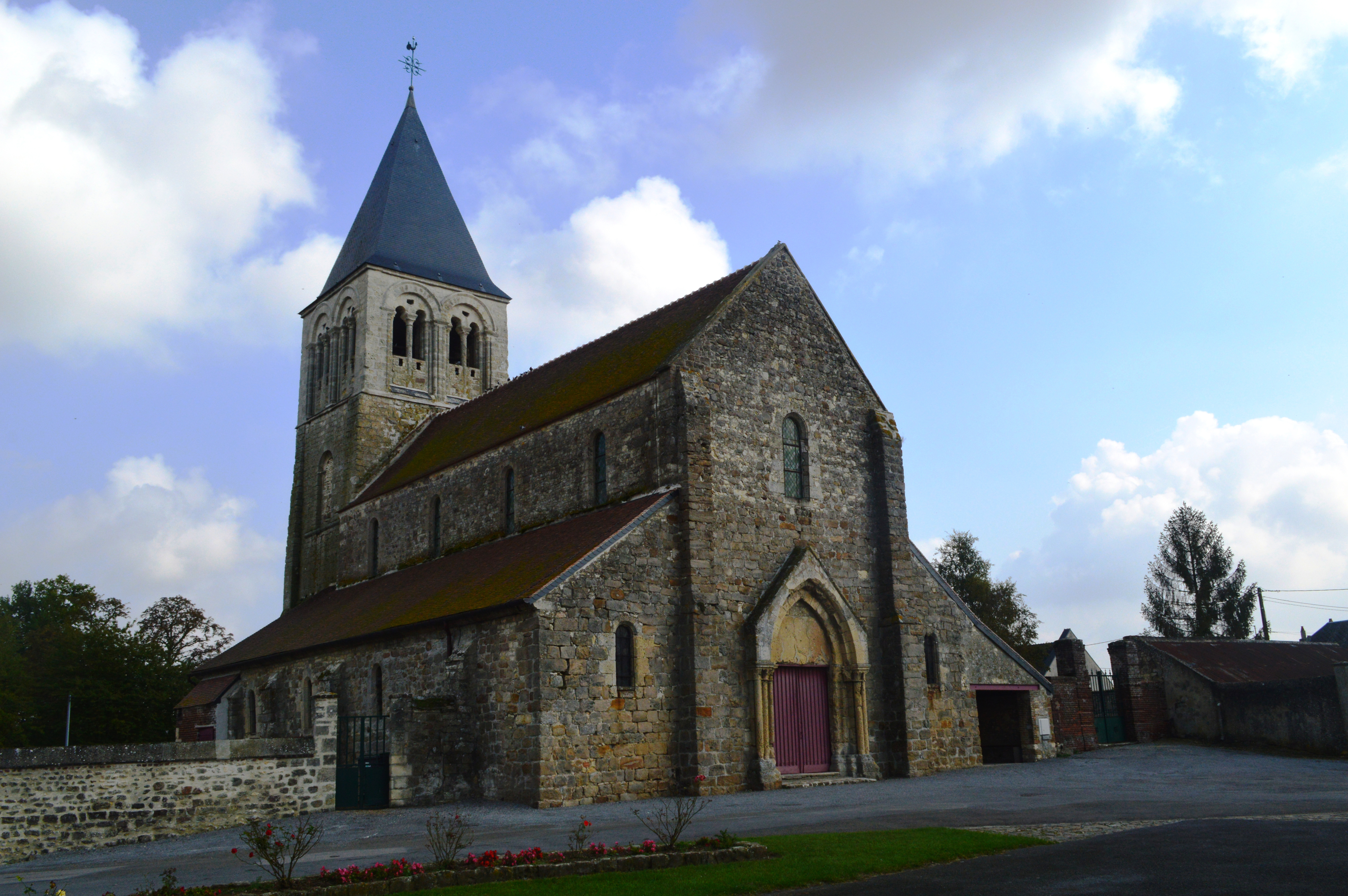
The Church of Saint Martin

- The Church of Saint Martin (12th century) is registered as an historical monument.

Picture Gallery

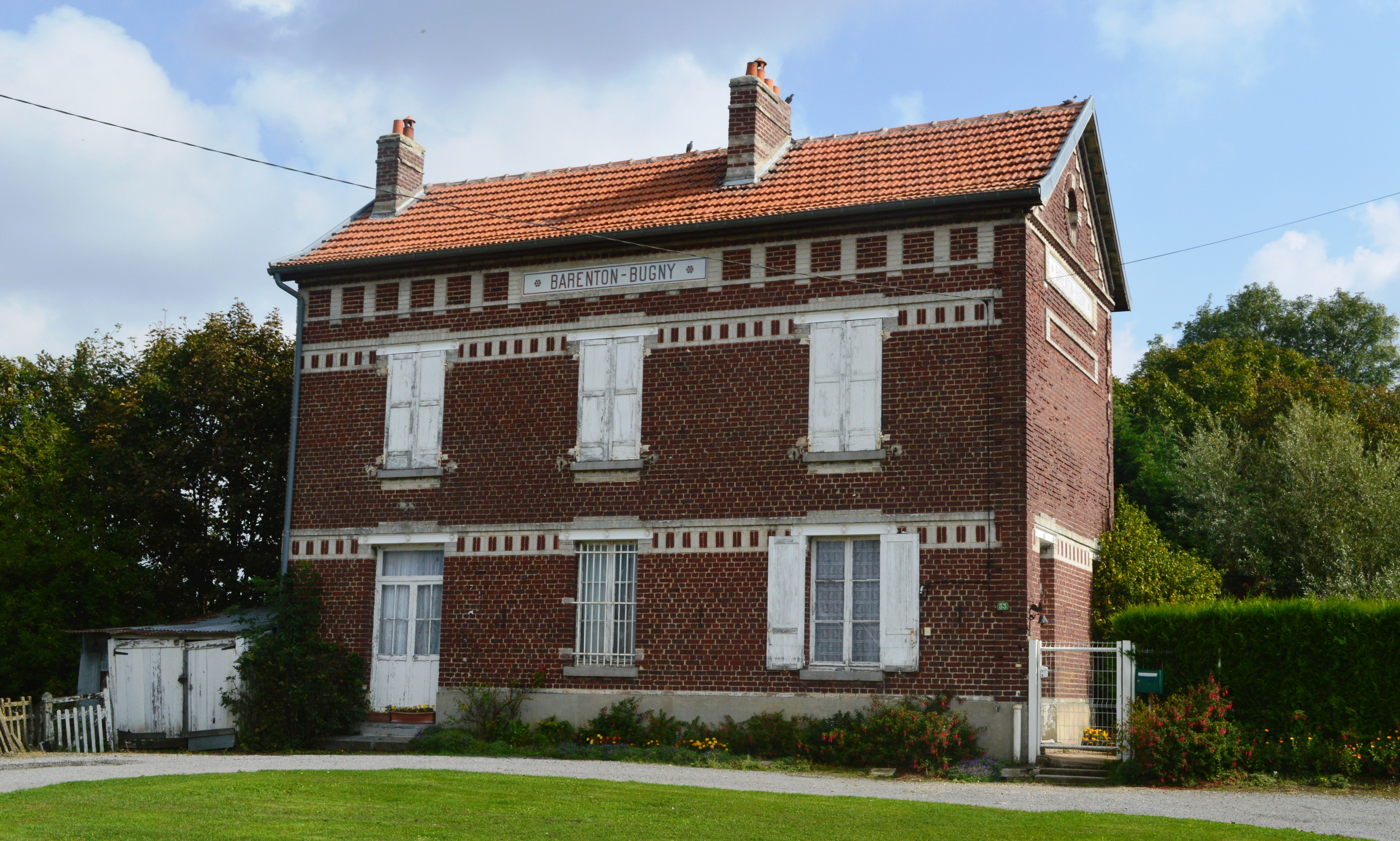
Barenton-Bugny Railway Station

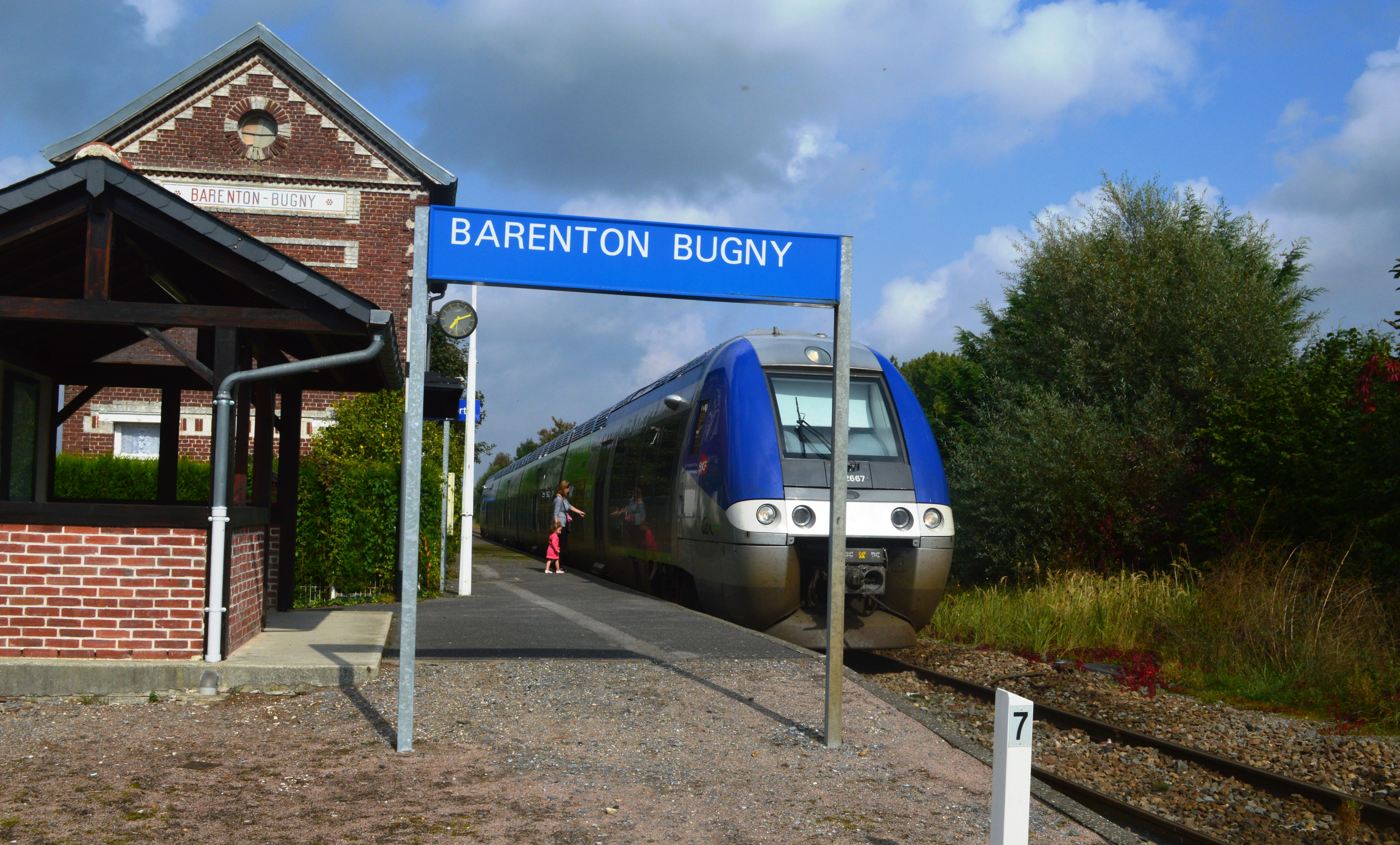
A train at Barenton-Bugny Railway Station

== Notable People linked to the commune ==
- René Blondelle, Senator for Aisne and one of the largest postwar farmers in Barenton-Bugny.

== See also ==
- Communes of the Aisne department
