= Pouilly-sur-Serre =

- Commune
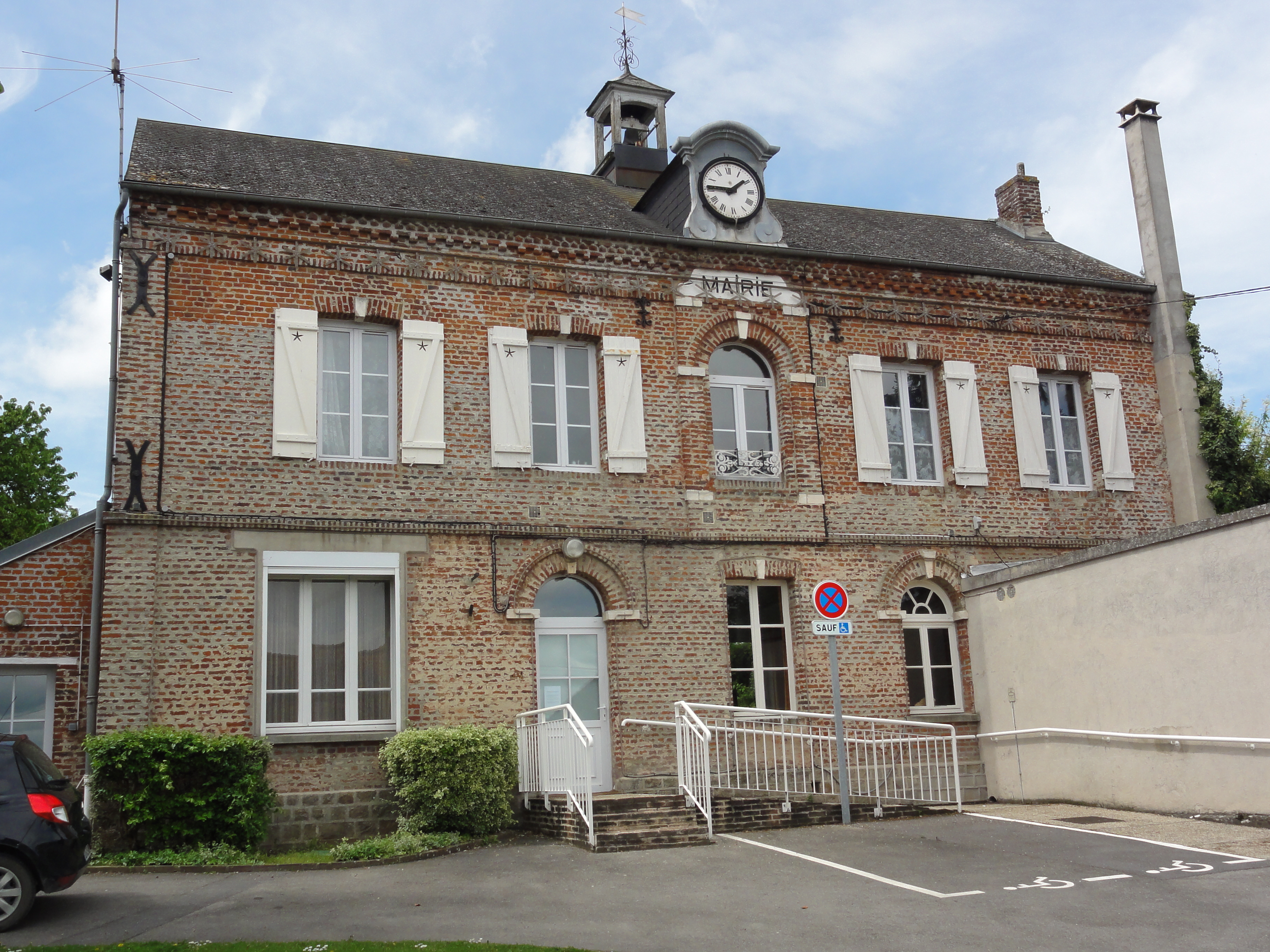
- The town hall of Pouilly-sur-Serre
- Location of Pouilly-sur-Serre
- Location within France Location within Hauts-de-France
- Coordinates: 49°40′57″N 3°35′21″E
- Country: France
- Region: Hauts-de-France
- Department: Aisne
- Arrondissement: Laon
- Canton: Marle
- Intercommunality: Pays de la Serre

Government
  - Mayor (2026–32): Dominique Cillier
- Area^{1}: 9.9 km^{2} (3.8 sq mi)
- Elevation: 61 m (200 ft)
- Highest elevation: 90 m (300 ft)
- Lowest elevation: 56 m (184 ft)
- Population (2023): 490
  - Density: 49/km^{2} (130/sq mi)
- Time zone: UTC+01:00 (CET)
  - Summer (DST): UTC+02:00 (CEST)
- INSEE/Postal code: 02617 /02270
- ^{1} French Land Register data, which excludes lakes, ponds, glaciers > 1 km^{2} (0.386 sq mi or 247 acres) and river estuaries.

Pouilly-sur-Serre (French pronunciation: [puji syʁ sɛʁ], literally Pouilly on Serre) is a commune in the Aisne department, Hauts-de-France, northern France with approximately 530 inhabitants. Pouilly-sur-Serre is 3 km southwest of Crécy-sur-Serre and 13 km north of Laon. The river Serre forms the northern border of the commune. Pouilly is in the middle of a huge agricultural plain, where the fields are typically used for growing vegetables and grains.

== History ==
The village was given to Saint Remi, the Bishop of Reims (b. 437) by Clovis I, the Frankish king from 481 to 511. Saint Remi himself made the contribution of the Laon church. In 1568, the village was pillaged and sacked by Calvinists. Pouilly was the location of a leprosy facility that was part of a Laon religious order. In 1883, Pouilly took the name "Pouilly-sur-Serre".

== Economy ==
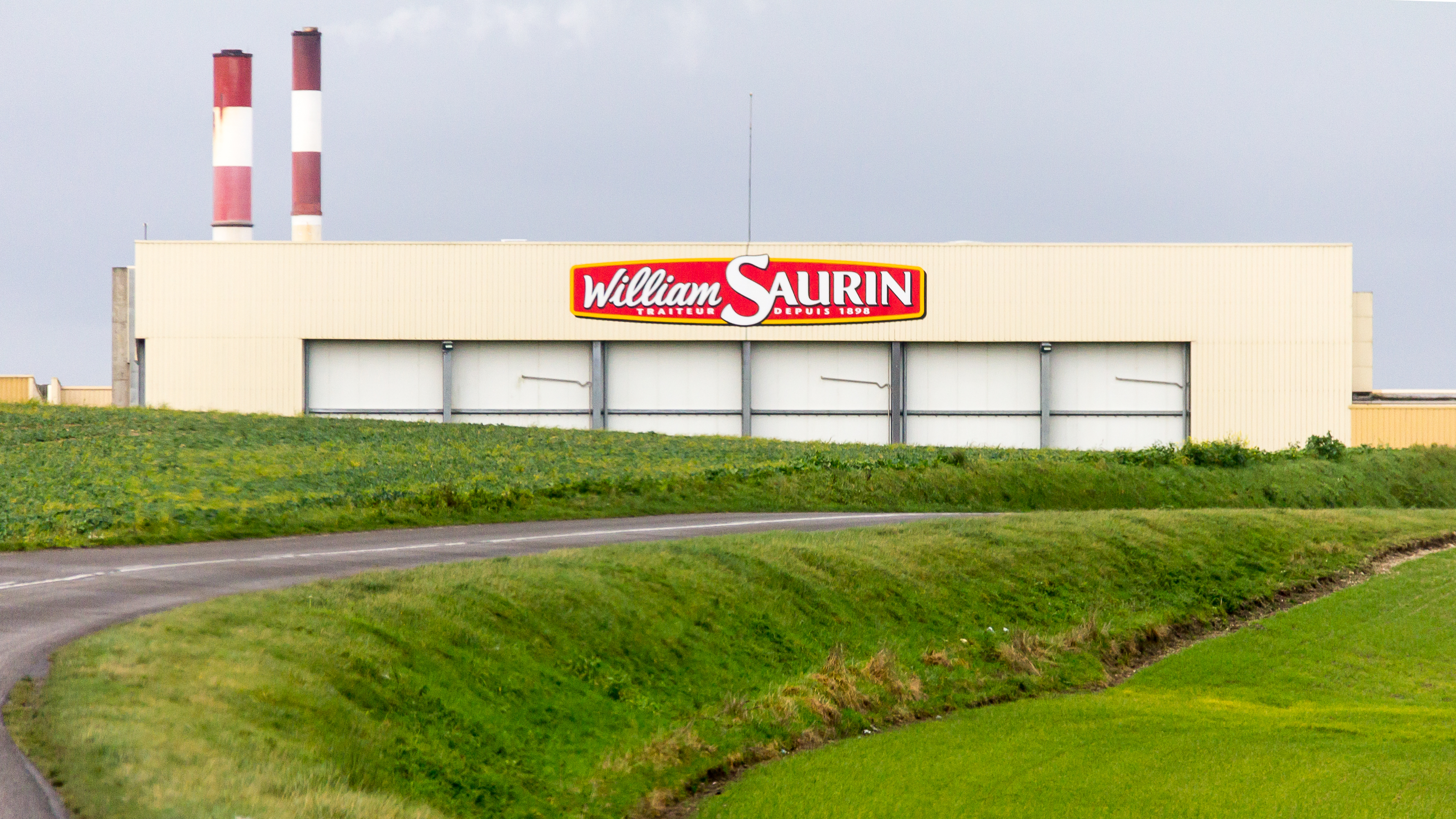
William Saurin

In Pouilly chicory, grains, beets, and potatoes are cultivated. The William Saurin company employs 343 people. About 75,000 tonnes of Italian, exotic, and quenelles dishes are made each year, under the trademarks "Garbit", "Petitjean" and "Panzani".

== Population ==
Historical population
Year	Pop.	±% p.a.
1968	516	—
1975	515	−0.03%
1982	508	−0.20%
1990	525	+0.41%
1999	504	−0.45%
2007	535	+0.75%
2012	505	−1.15%
2017	502	−0.12%
2023	490	−0.40%
Source: INSEE

== See also ==
- Communes of the Aisne department
