= Barenton-Cel =

- Commune
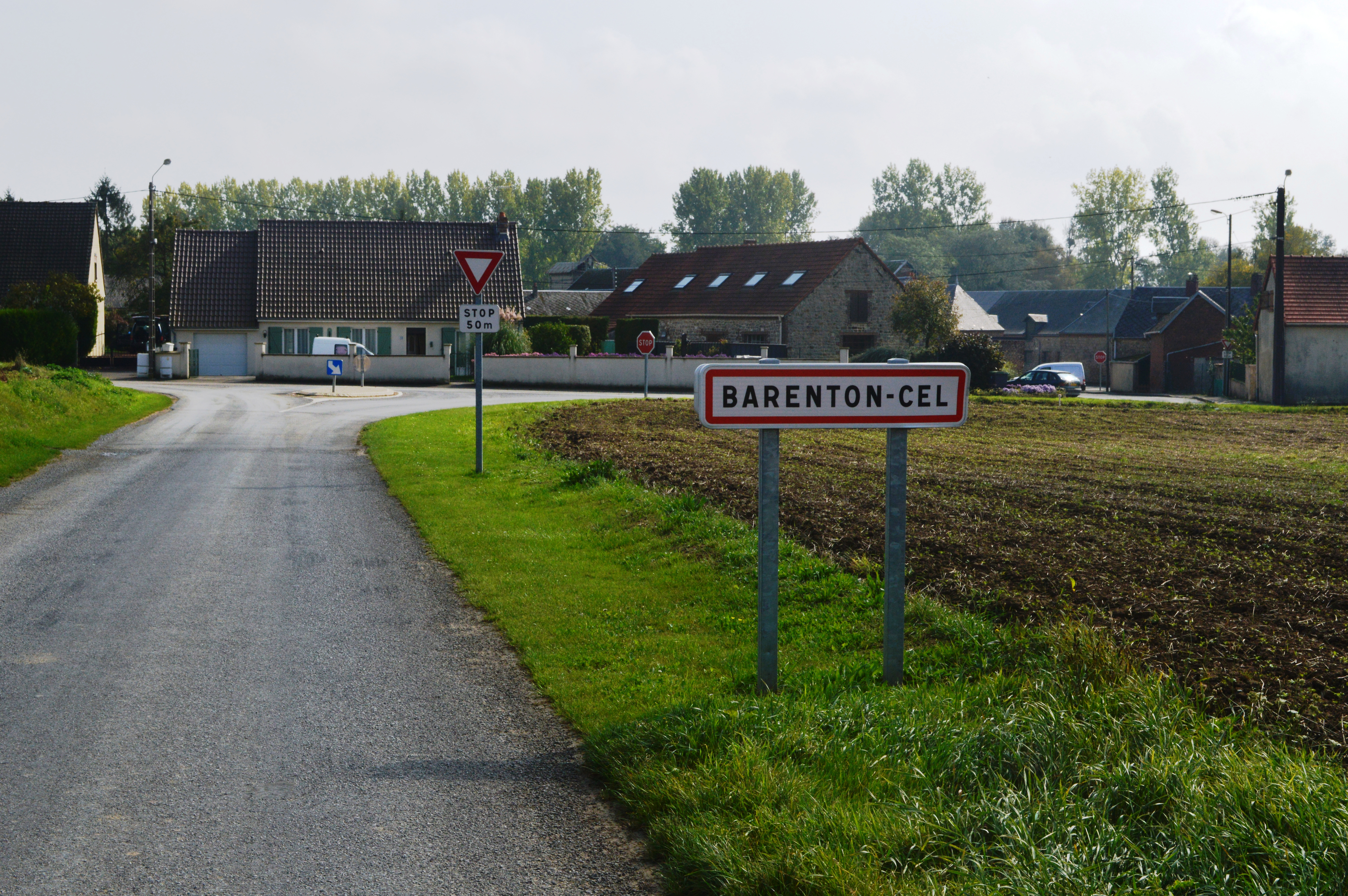
- Location of Barenton-Cel
- Location within France Location within Hauts-de-France
- Coordinates: 49°38′36″N 3°39′12″E
- Country: France
- Region: Hauts-de-France
- Department: Aisne
- Arrondissement: Laon
- Canton: Marle
- Intercommunality: Pays de la Serre

Government
  - Mayor (2026–32): Pierre-François Brazier
- Area^{1}: 6.69 km^{2} (2.58 sq mi)
- Highest elevation: 106 m (348 ft)
- Lowest elevation: 63 m (207 ft)
- Population (2023): 108
  - Density: 16.1/km^{2} (41.8/sq mi)
- Time zone: UTC+01:00 (CET)
  - Summer (DST): UTC+02:00 (CEST)
- INSEE/Postal code: 02047 /02000
- ^{1} French Land Register data, which excludes lakes, ponds, glaciers > 1 km^{2} (0.386 sq mi or 247 acres) and river estuaries.

Barenton-Cel (French pronunciation: [baʁɑ̃tɔ̃ sɛl]) is a commune in the department of Aisne in the Hauts-de-France region of northern France.

== Geography ==
Barenton-Cel is located some 10 km north by northeast of Laon and 40 km southeast of Saint-Quentin. It can be accessed by the D547 road from Verneuil-sur-Serre in the northeast continuing southwest through the commune and the village to Aulnois-sous-Laon in the southwest. There is also the D545 road from Barenton-Bugny on the southeastern border. The commune consists entirely of farmland with no other villages or hamlets.

The Ru des Barentons stream forms the southeastern border of the commune and flows northeast to join the Souche river in the north.

== Population ==
Historical population
Year	Pop.	±% p.a.
1968	108	—
1975	129	+2.57%
1982	147	+1.88%
1990	141	−0.52%
1999	133	−0.65%
2007	147	+1.26%
2012	133	−1.98%
2017	114	−3.04%
2023	108	−0.90%
Source: INSEE

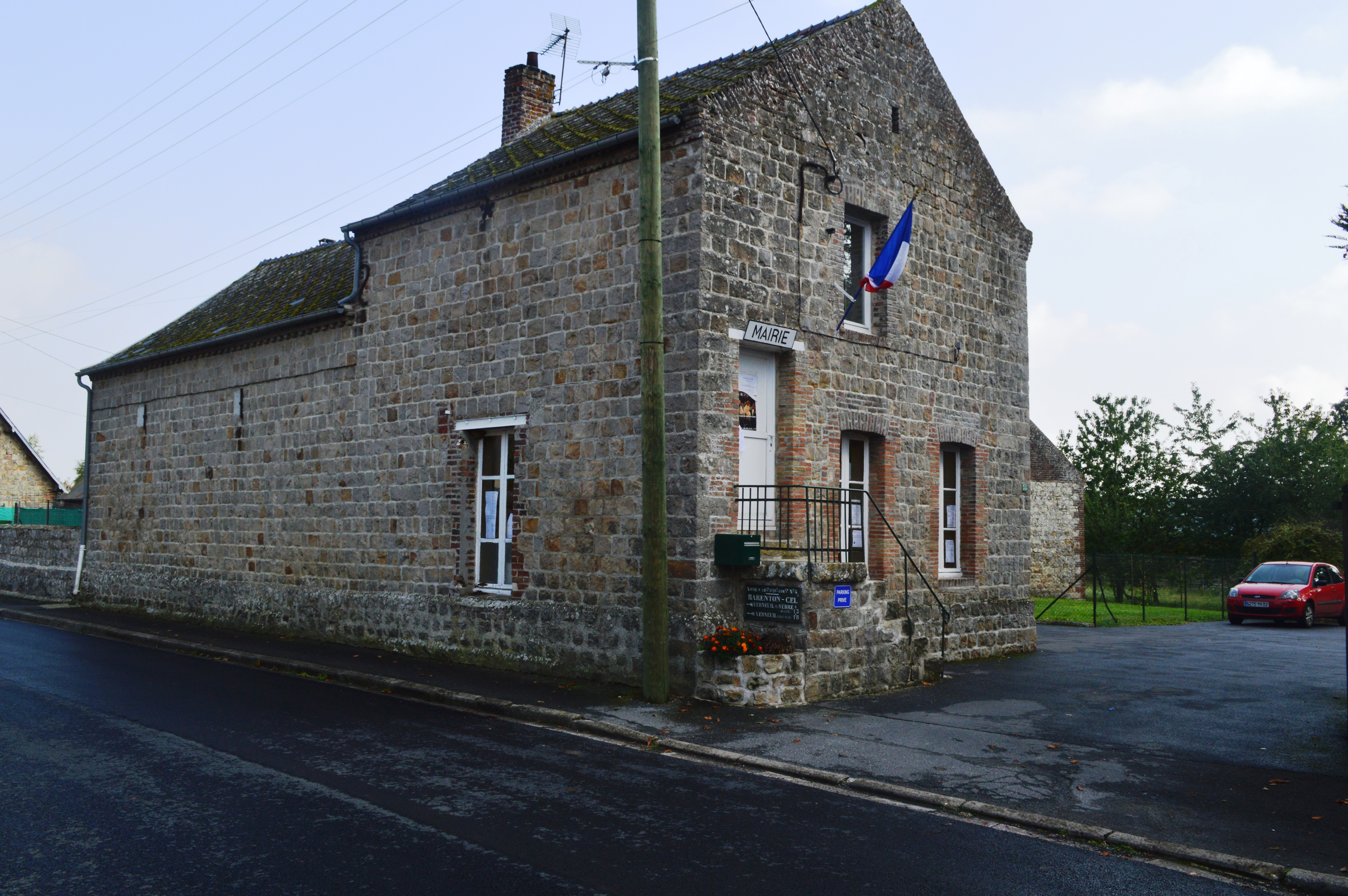
The Town Hall

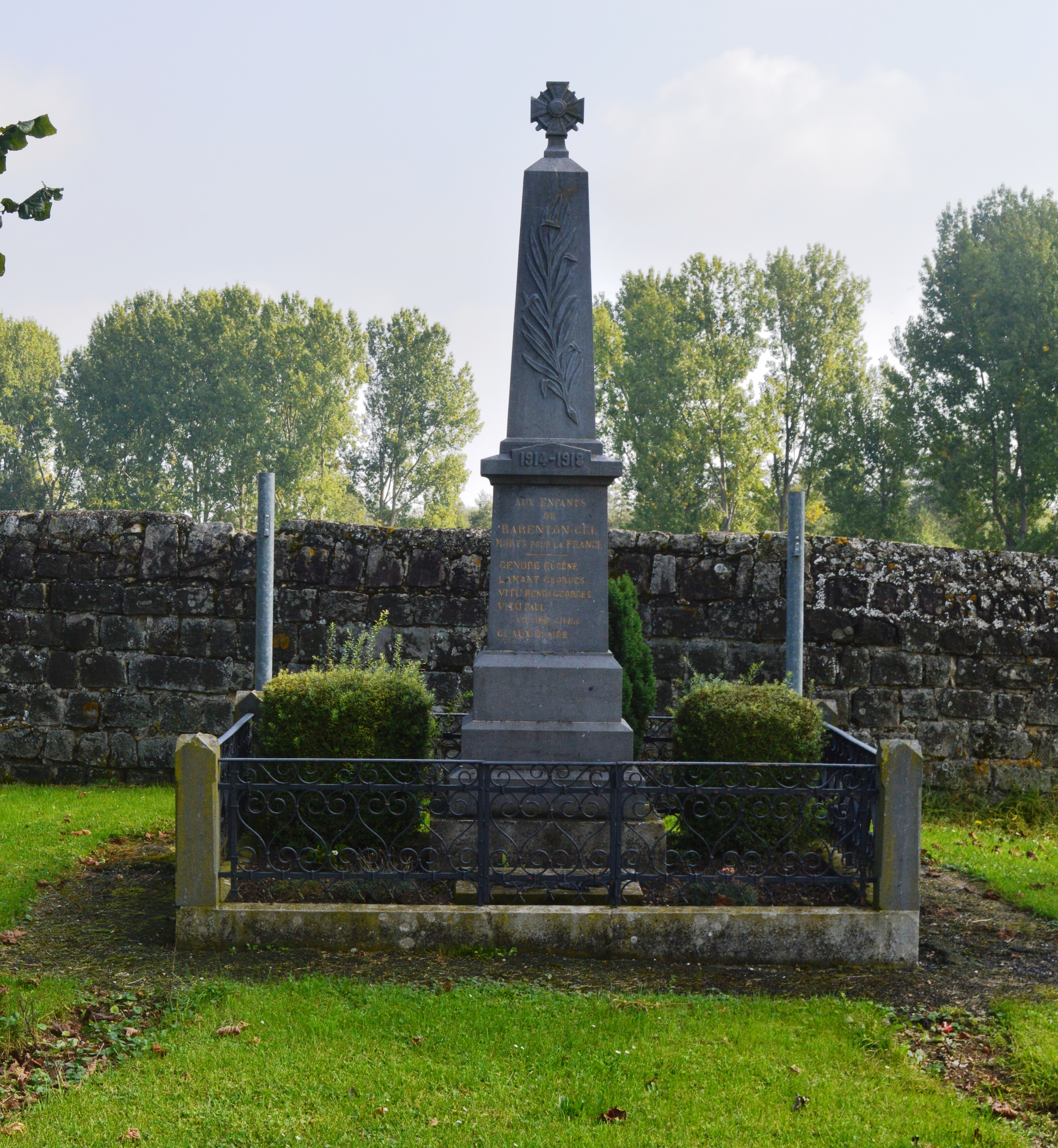
Barenton-Cel War Memorial

Picture Gallery

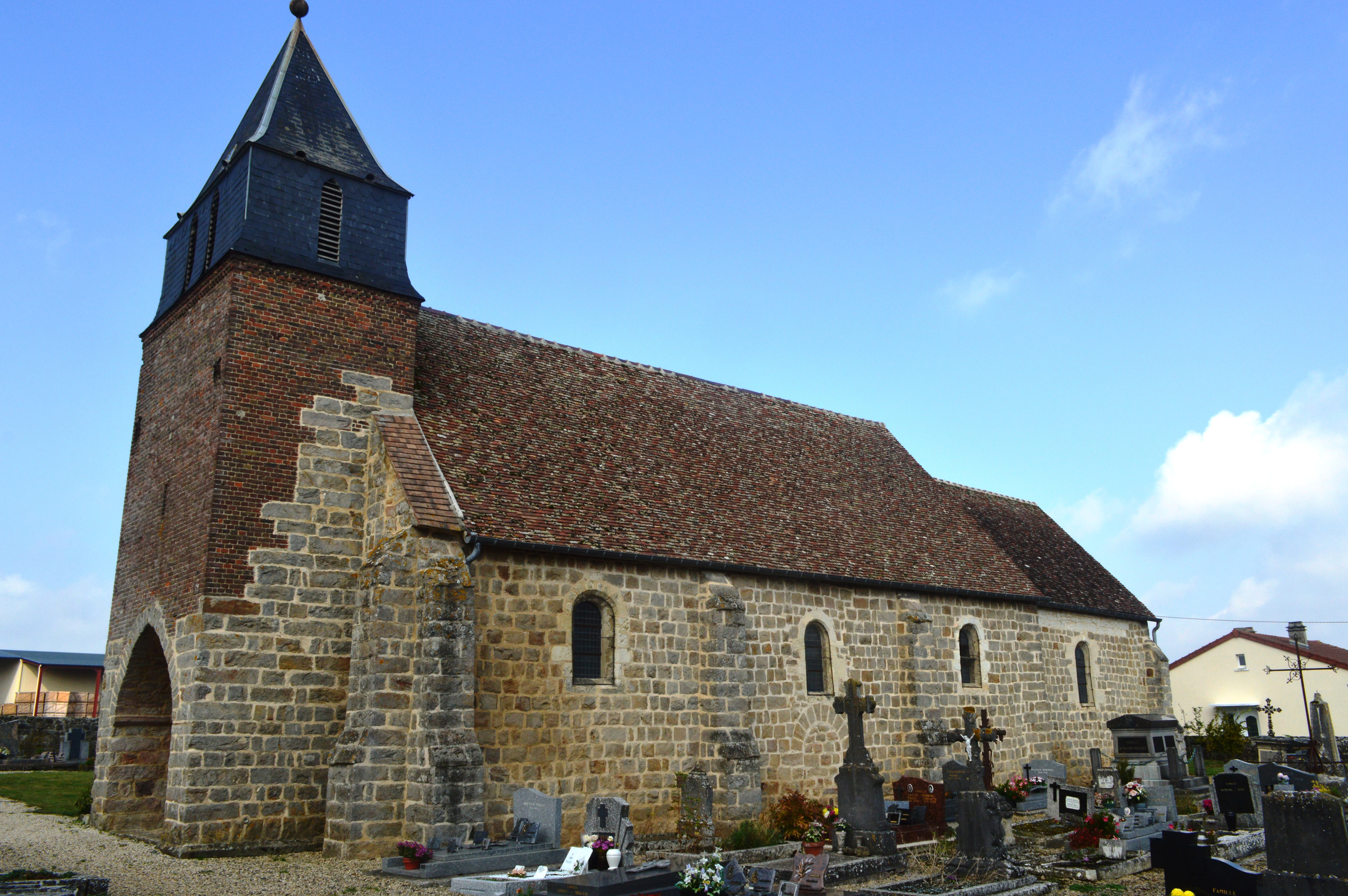
Barenton-Cel Church

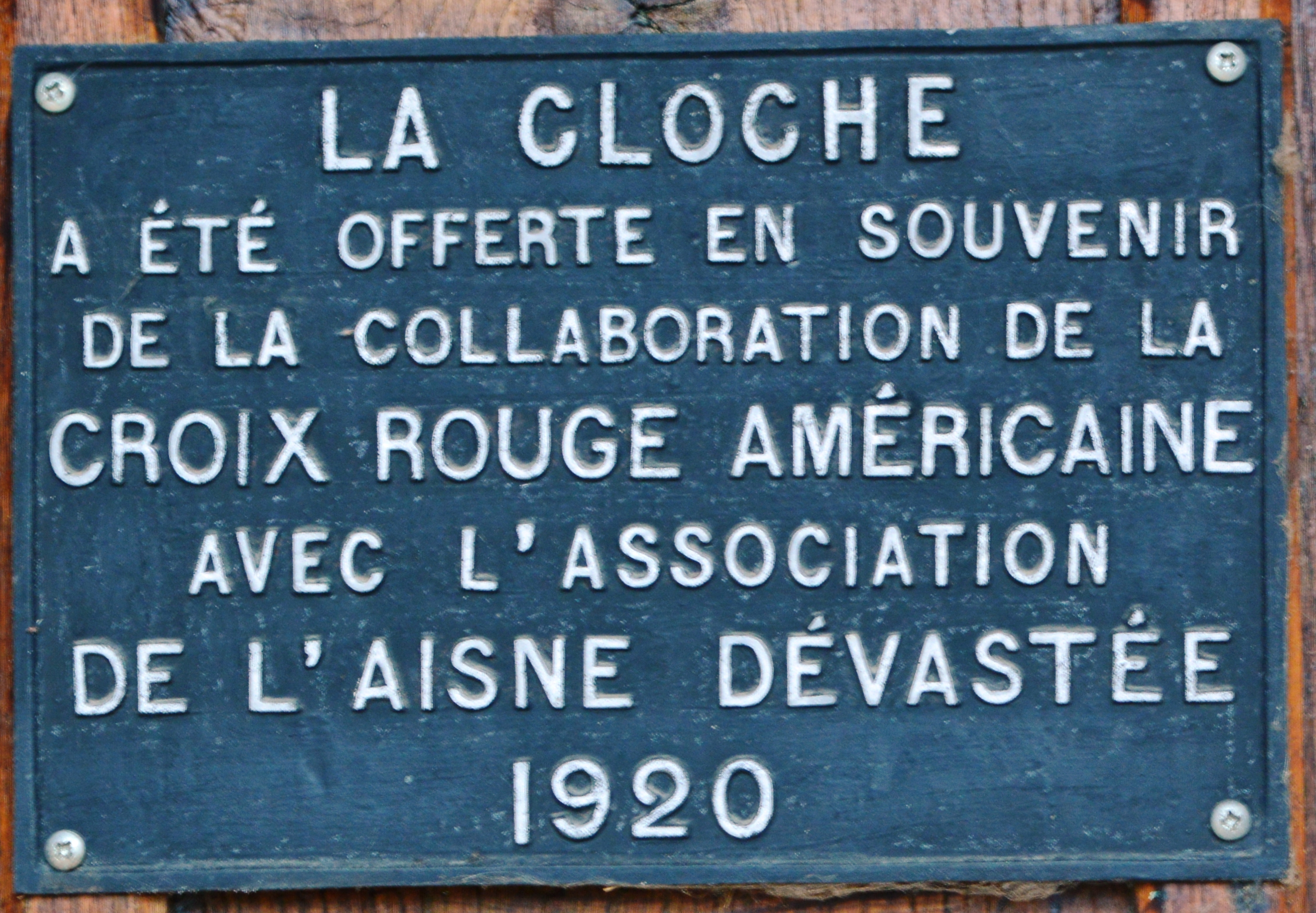
Plaque on the Church: "The Bell is given in remembrance of the collaboration of the American Red Cross with the Association of Devastated Aisne".

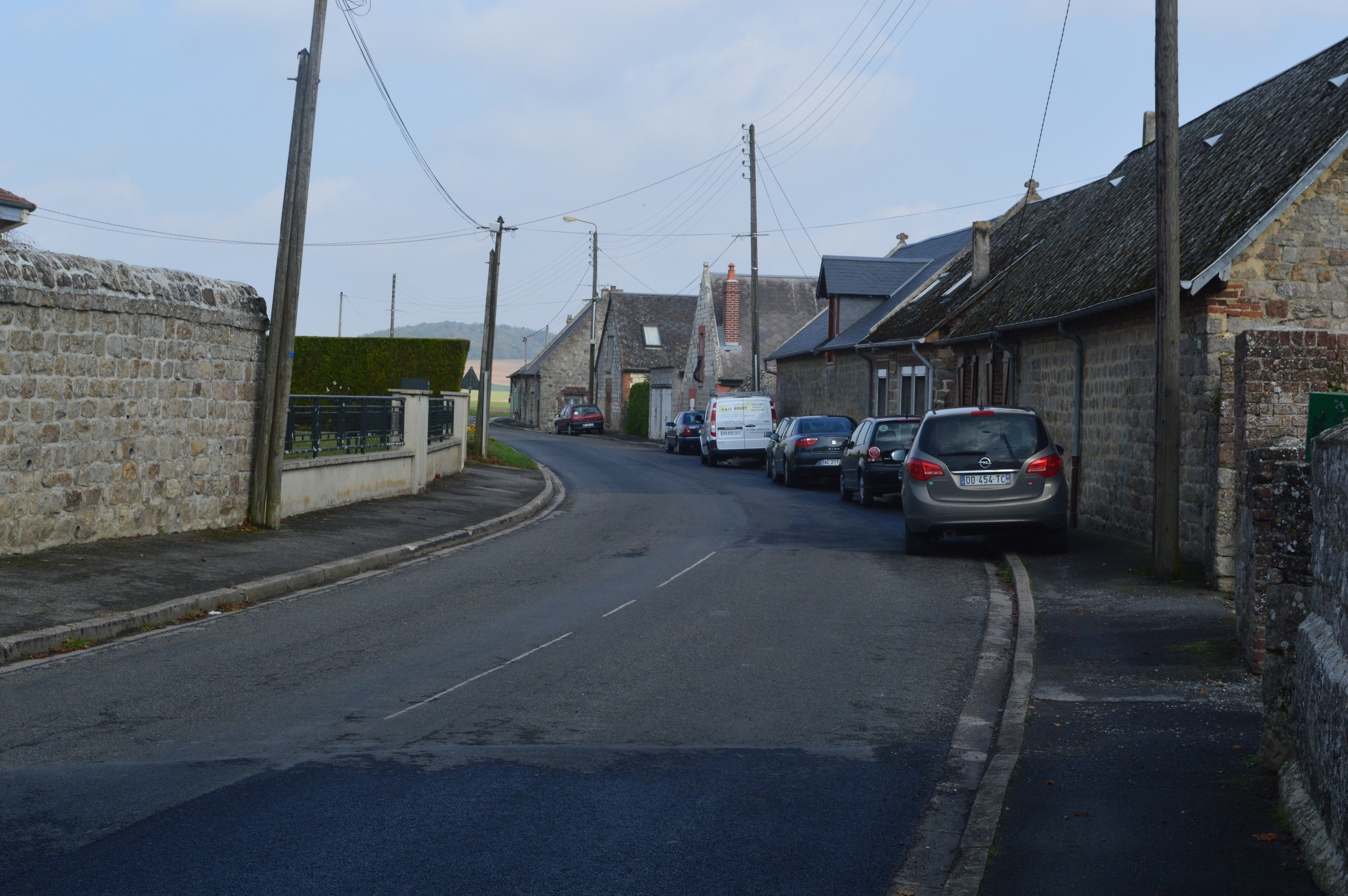
A street in Barenton-Cel

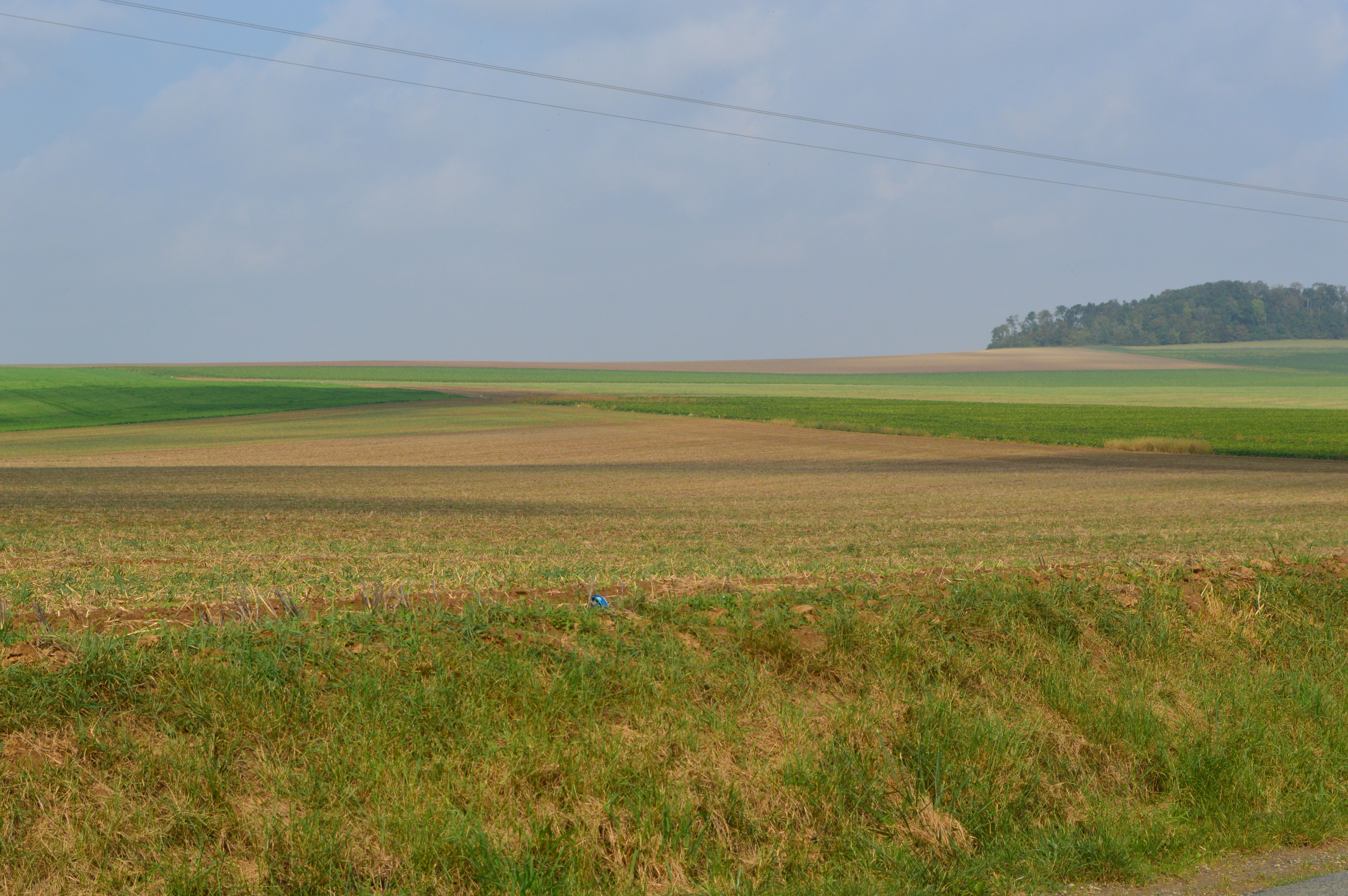
Barenton-Cel Landscape

== See also ==
- Communes of the Aisne department
