= Froidmont-Cohartille =

- Commune
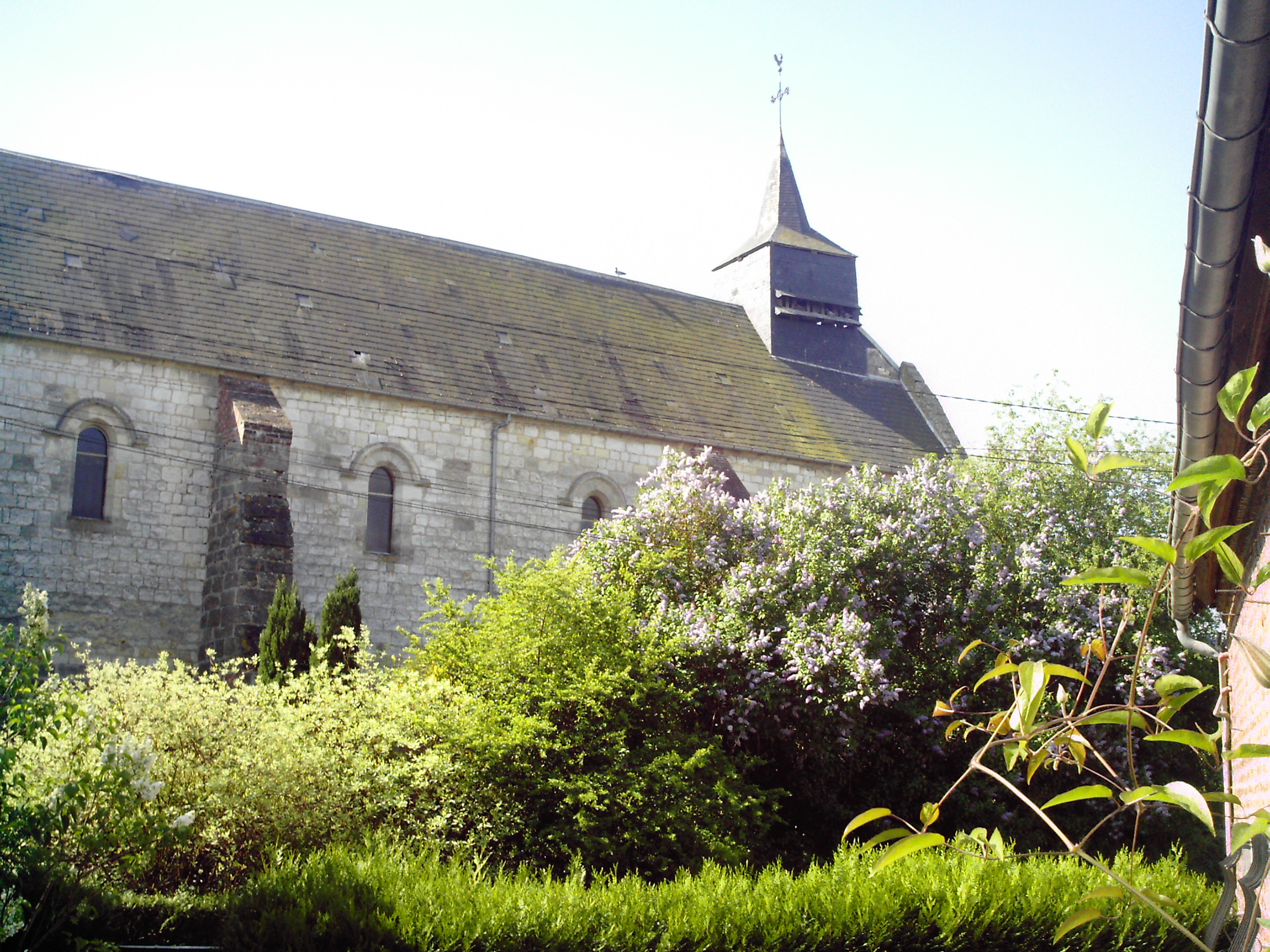
- The church of Froidmont-Cohartille
- Location of Froidmont-Cohartille
- Location within France Location within Hauts-de-France
- Coordinates: 49°41′13″N 3°42′36″E
- Country: France
- Region: Hauts-de-France
- Department: Aisne
- Arrondissement: Laon
- Canton: Marle
- Intercommunality: Pays de la Serre

Government
  - Mayor (2026–32): François Nuytten
- Area^{1}: 8.81 km^{2} (3.40 sq mi)
- Elevation: 95 m (312 ft)
- Highest elevation: 107 m (351 ft)
- Lowest elevation: 62 m (203 ft)
- Population (2023): 236
  - Density: 26.8/km^{2} (69.4/sq mi)
- Time zone: UTC+01:00 (CET)
  - Summer (DST): UTC+02:00 (CEST)
- INSEE/Postal code: 02338 /02270
- ^{1} French Land Register data, which excludes lakes, ponds, glaciers > 1 km^{2} (0.386 sq mi or 247 acres) and river estuaries.

Froidmont-Cohartille is a commune in the Aisne department in Hauts-de-France in northern France. The estimated population as of 2021 is below 300 residents. The Saint-Martin church, built in the 12th century, adorned with wall paintings dating from the 15th century as well as, several private Renaissance castles bear witness to the medieval history of the region.

== Population ==
Historical population
Year	Pop.	±% p.a.
1968	278	—
1975	251	−1.45%
1982	240	−0.64%
1990	234	−0.32%
1999	209	−1.25%
2007	205	−0.24%
2012	250	+4.05%
2017	261	+0.86%
2023	236	−1.66%
Source: INSEE

== See also ==
- Communes of the Aisne department
