= Montigny-sur-Crécy =

- Commune
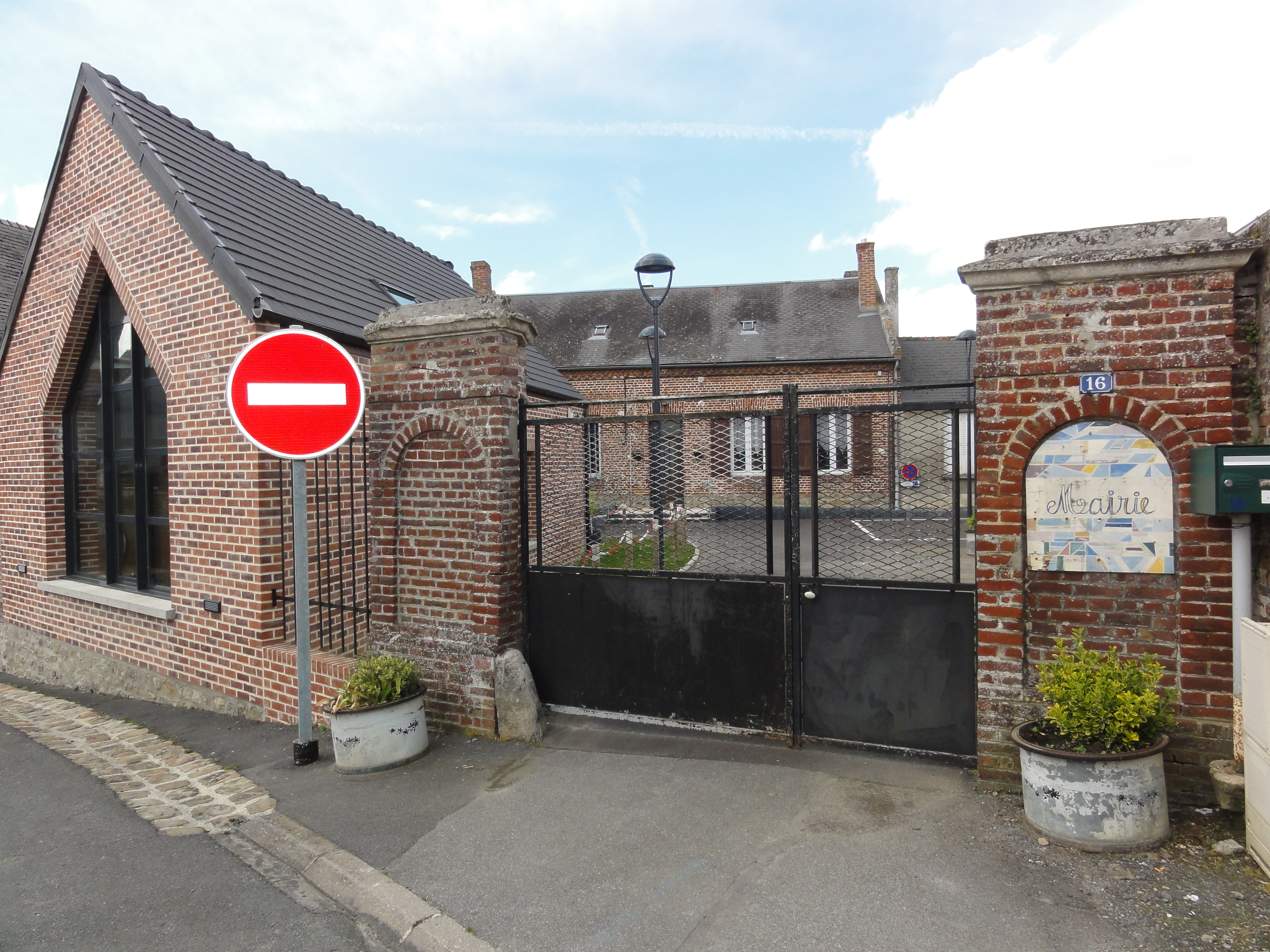
- The town hall and school of Montigny-sur-Crécy
- Location of Montigny-sur-Crécy
- Location within France Location within Hauts-de-France
- Coordinates: 49°43′00″N 3°35′08″E
- Country: France
- Region: Hauts-de-France
- Department: Aisne
- Arrondissement: Laon
- Canton: Marle
- Intercommunality: Pays de la Serre

Government
  - Mayor (2026–32): Jean-Michel Wattier
- Area^{1}: 8.53 km^{2} (3.29 sq mi)
- Elevation: 110 m (360 ft)
- Highest elevation: 124 m (407 ft)
- Lowest elevation: 55 m (180 ft)
- Population (2023): 306
  - Density: 35.9/km^{2} (92.9/sq mi)
- Time zone: UTC+01:00 (CET)
  - Summer (DST): UTC+02:00 (CEST)
- INSEE/Postal code: 02517 /02270
- ^{1} French Land Register data, which excludes lakes, ponds, glaciers > 1 km^{2} (0.386 sq mi or 247 acres) and river estuaries.

Montigny-sur-Crécy (French pronunciation: [mɔ̃tiɲi syʁ kʁesi], literally Montigny on Crécy) is a commune in the Aisne department in Hauts-de-France in northern France.

== Population ==
Historical population
Year	Pop.	±% p.a.
1968	323	—
1975	308	−0.68%
1982	303	−0.23%
1990	306	+0.12%
1999	312	+0.22%
2007	312	+0.00%
2012	325	+0.82%
2017	315	−0.62%
2023	306	−0.48%
Source: INSEE

== See also ==
- Communes of the Aisne department
