= Dercy, Aisne =

Dercy
- Commune
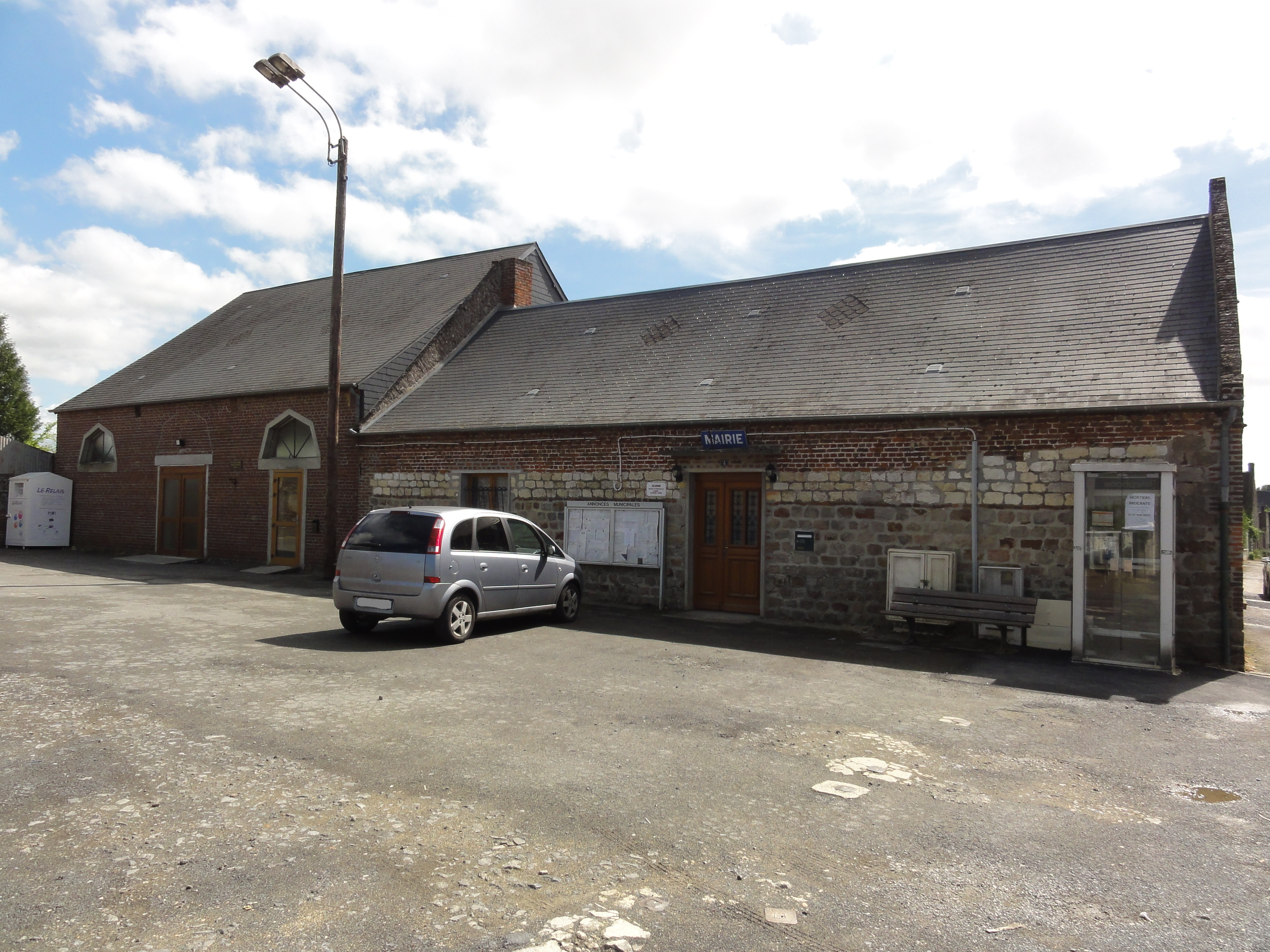
- The town hall of Dercy
- Location of Dercy
- Location within France Location within Hauts-de-France
- Coordinates: 49°42′15″N 3°41′09″E
- Country: France
- Region: Hauts-de-France
- Department: Aisne
- Arrondissement: Laon
- Canton: Marle
- Intercommunality: Pays de la Serre

Government
  - Mayor (2026–32): Bernard Bornier
- Area^{1}: 11.17 km^{2} (4.31 sq mi)
- Elevation: 68 m (223 ft)
- Highest elevation: 140 m (460 ft)
- Lowest elevation: 63 m (207 ft)
- Population (2023): 392
  - Density: 35.1/km^{2} (90.9/sq mi)
- Time zone: UTC+01:00 (CET)
  - Summer (DST): UTC+02:00 (CEST)
- INSEE/Postal code: 02261 /02270
- ^{1} French Land Register data, which excludes lakes, ponds, glaciers > 1 km^{2} (0.386 sq mi or 247 acres) and river estuaries.

Dercy (French pronunciation: [dɛʁsi]) is a commune in the Aisne department in Hauts-de-France in northern France.

== Population ==
Historical population
| Year | Pop. | ±% p.a. |
|---|---|---|
| 1968 | 412 | — |
| 1975 | 386 | −0.93% |
| 1982 | 381 | −0.19% |
| 1990 | 361 | −0.67% |
| 1999 | 399 | +1.12% |
| 2007 | 387 | −0.38% |
| 2012 | 375 | −0.63% |
| 2017 | 391 | +0.84% |
| 2023 | 392 | +0.04% |
Source: INSEE

== See also ==
- Communes of the Aisne department
