= Monceau-le-Waast =

- Commune
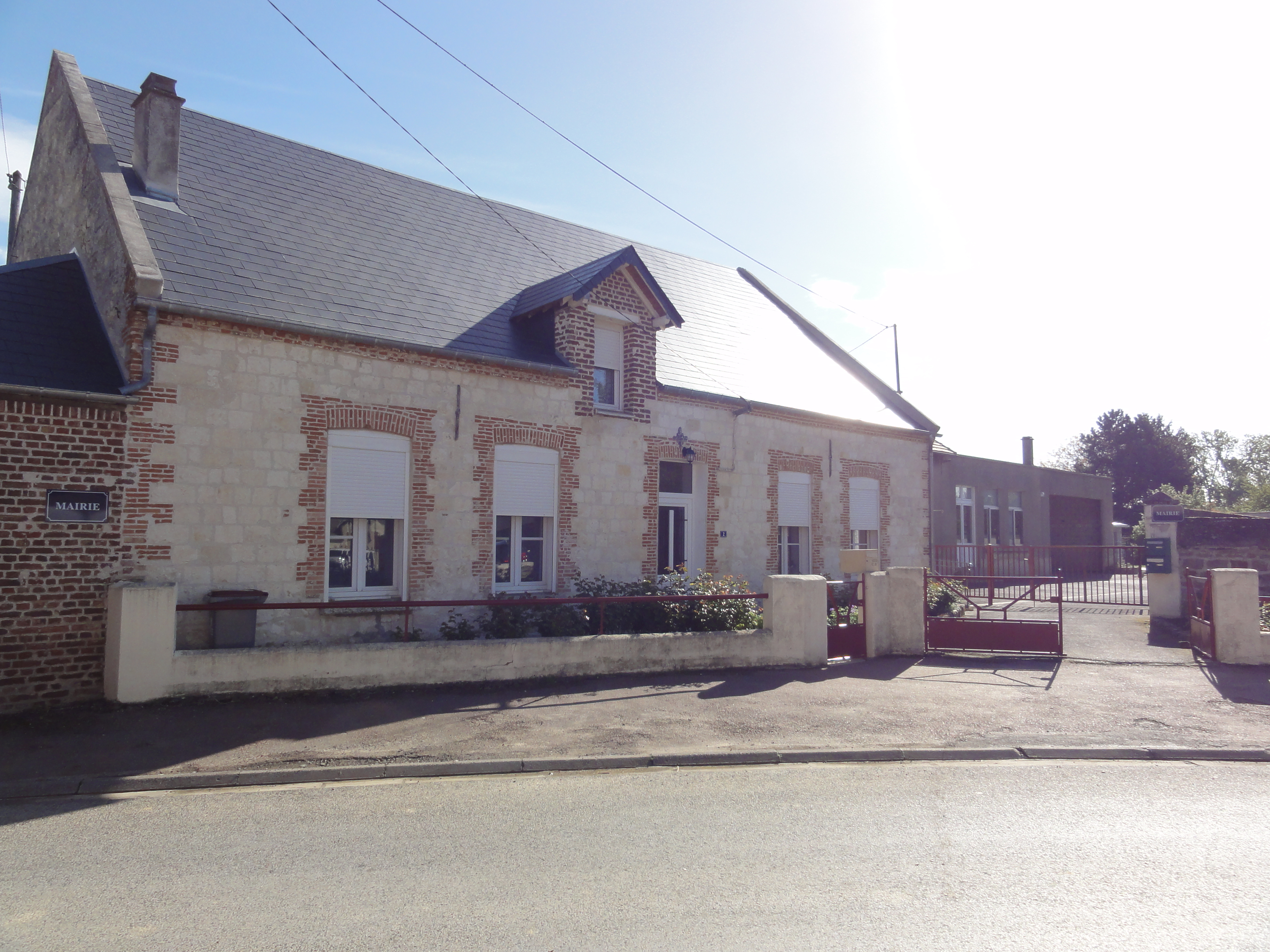
- The town hall of Monceau-le-Waast
- Location of Monceau-le-Waast
- Location within France Location within Hauts-de-France
- Coordinates: 49°37′11″N 3°42′52″E
- Country: France
- Region: Hauts-de-France
- Department: Aisne
- Arrondissement: Laon
- Canton: Marle
- Intercommunality: Pays de la Serre

Government
  - Mayor (2026–32): Nicole Buirette
- Area^{1}: 5.41 km^{2} (2.09 sq mi)
- Elevation: 80 m (260 ft)
- Highest elevation: 106 m (348 ft)
- Lowest elevation: 68 m (223 ft)
- Population (2023): 211
  - Density: 39.0/km^{2} (101/sq mi)
- Time zone: UTC+01:00 (CET)
  - Summer (DST): UTC+02:00 (CEST)
- INSEE/Postal code: 02493 /02840
- ^{1} French Land Register data, which excludes lakes, ponds, glaciers > 1 km^{2} (0.386 sq mi or 247 acres) and river estuaries.

Monceau-le-Waast is a commune in the Aisne department in Hauts-de-France in northern France.

== Population ==
Historical population
Year	Pop.	±% p.a.
1968	303	—
1975	284	−0.92%
1982	291	+0.35%
1990	259	−1.45%
1999	230	−1.31%
2007	238	+0.43%
2012	226	−1.03%
2017	220	−0.54%
2023	211	−0.69%
Source: INSEE

== See also ==
- Communes of the Aisne department
