= Verneuil-sur-Serre =

- Commune
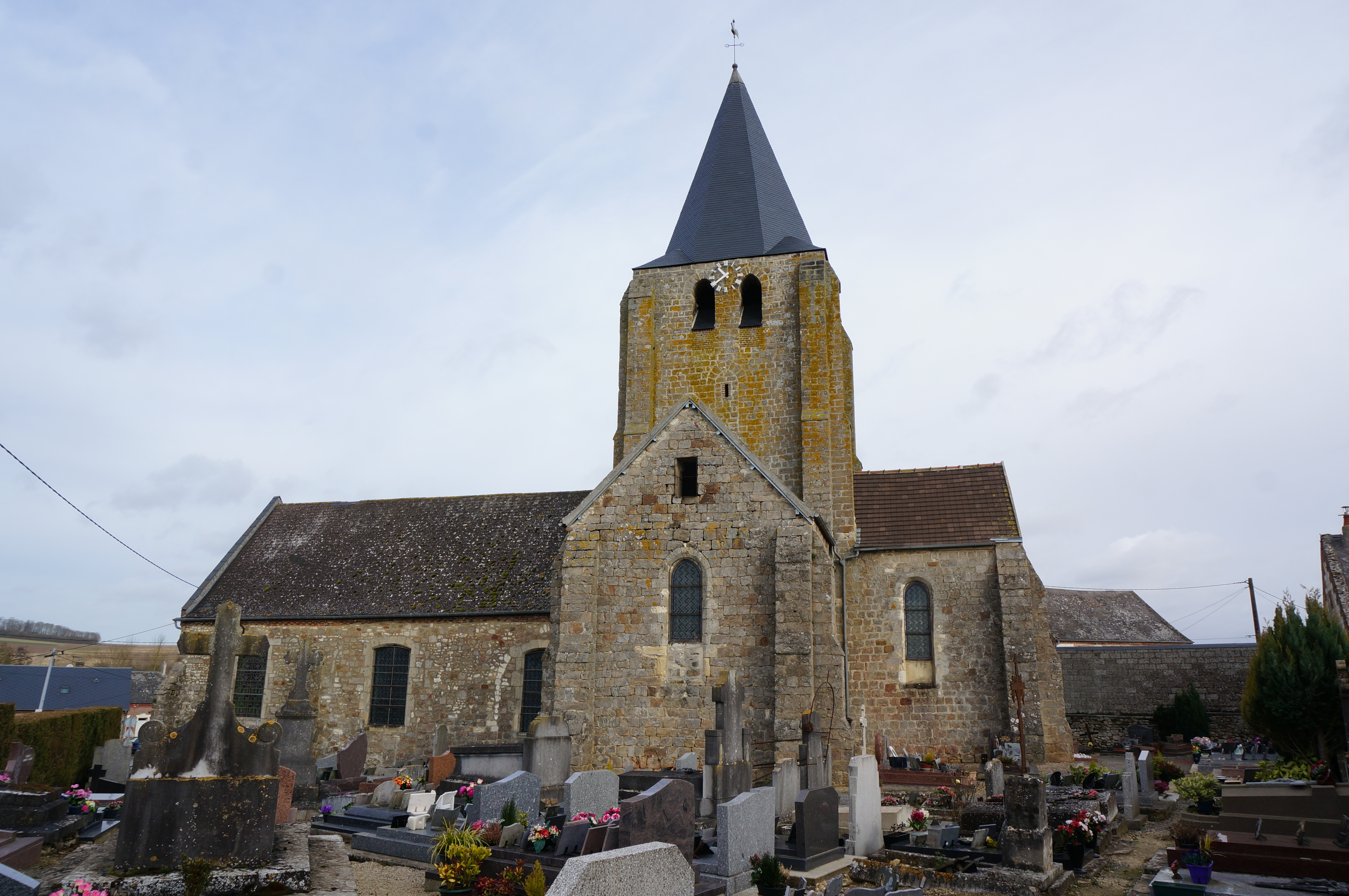
- The church of Verneuil
- Location of Verneuil-sur-Serre
- Location within France Location within Hauts-de-France
- Coordinates: 49°39′05″N 3°40′28″E
- Country: France
- Region: Hauts-de-France
- Department: Aisne
- Arrondissement: Laon
- Canton: Marle
- Intercommunality: Pays de la Serre

Government
  - Mayor (2026–32): Thierry Vion
- Area^{1}: 7.86 km^{2} (3.03 sq mi)
- Elevation: 69 m (226 ft)
- Highest elevation: 91 m (299 ft)
- Lowest elevation: 62 m (203 ft)
- Population (2023): 249
  - Density: 31.7/km^{2} (82.0/sq mi)
- Time zone: UTC+01:00 (CET)
  - Summer (DST): UTC+02:00 (CEST)
- INSEE/Postal code: 02787 /02000
- ^{1} French Land Register data, which excludes lakes, ponds, glaciers > 1 km^{2} (0.386 sq mi or 247 acres) and river estuaries.

Verneuil-sur-Serre (French pronunciation: [vɛʁnœj syʁ sɛʁ], literally Verneuil on Serre) is a commune in the Aisne department in Hauts-de-France in northern France.

== Population ==
Historical population
Year	Pop.	±% p.a.
1968	238	—
1975	243	+0.30%
1982	265	+1.25%
1990	259	−0.29%
1999	253	−0.26%
2007	269	+0.77%
2012	258	−0.83%
2017	254	−0.31%
2023	249	−0.33%
Source: INSEE

== See also ==
- Communes of the Aisne department
