= Mortiers, Aisne =

Mortiers
- Commune
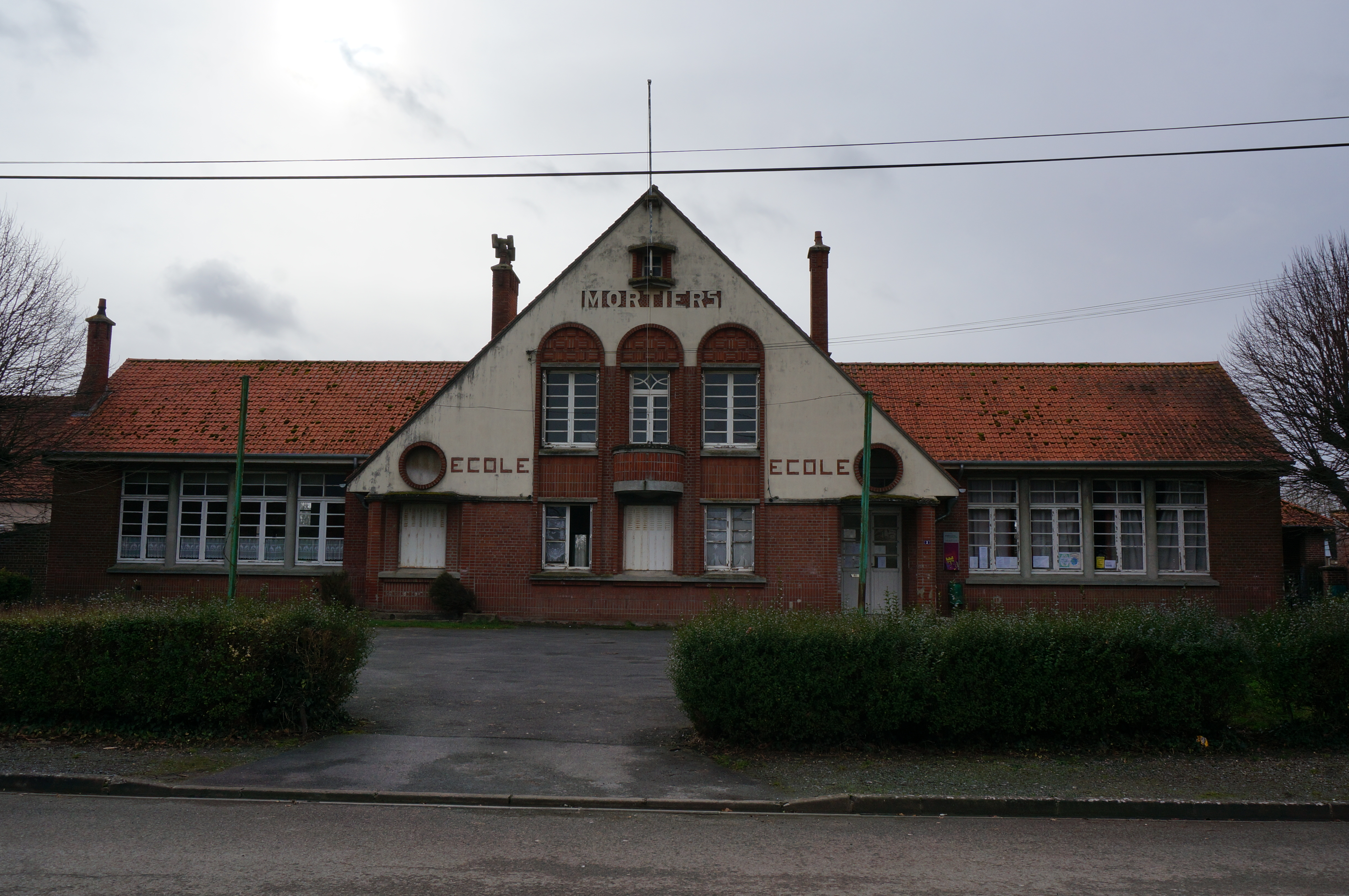
- The town hall of Mortiers
- Location of Mortiers
- Location within France Location within Hauts-de-France
- Coordinates: 49°41′16″N 3°40′09″E
- Country: France
- Region: Hauts-de-France
- Department: Aisne
- Arrondissement: Laon
- Canton: Marle
- Intercommunality: Pays de la Serre

Government
  - Mayor (2026–32): Emmanuel Claessens
- Area^{1}: 6.39 km^{2} (2.47 sq mi)
- Elevation: 67 m (220 ft)
- Highest elevation: 119 m (390 ft)
- Lowest elevation: 61 m (200 ft)
- Population (2023): 185
  - Density: 29.0/km^{2} (75.0/sq mi)
- Time zone: UTC+01:00 (CET)
  - Summer (DST): UTC+02:00 (CEST)
- INSEE/Postal code: 02529 /02270
- ^{1} French Land Register data, which excludes lakes, ponds, glaciers > 1 km^{2} (0.386 sq mi or 247 acres) and river estuaries.

Mortiers (French pronunciation: [mɔʁtje]) is a commune in the Aisne department in Hauts-de-France in northern France.

== Population ==
Historical population
Year	Pop.	±% p.a.
1968	246	—
1975	229	−1.02%
1982	199	−1.99%
1990	207	+0.49%
1999	213	+0.32%
2007	214	+0.06%
2012	201	−1.25%
2017	187	−1.43%
2023	185	−0.18%
Source: INSEE

== See also ==
- Communes of the Aisne department
