= Remies =

- Commune
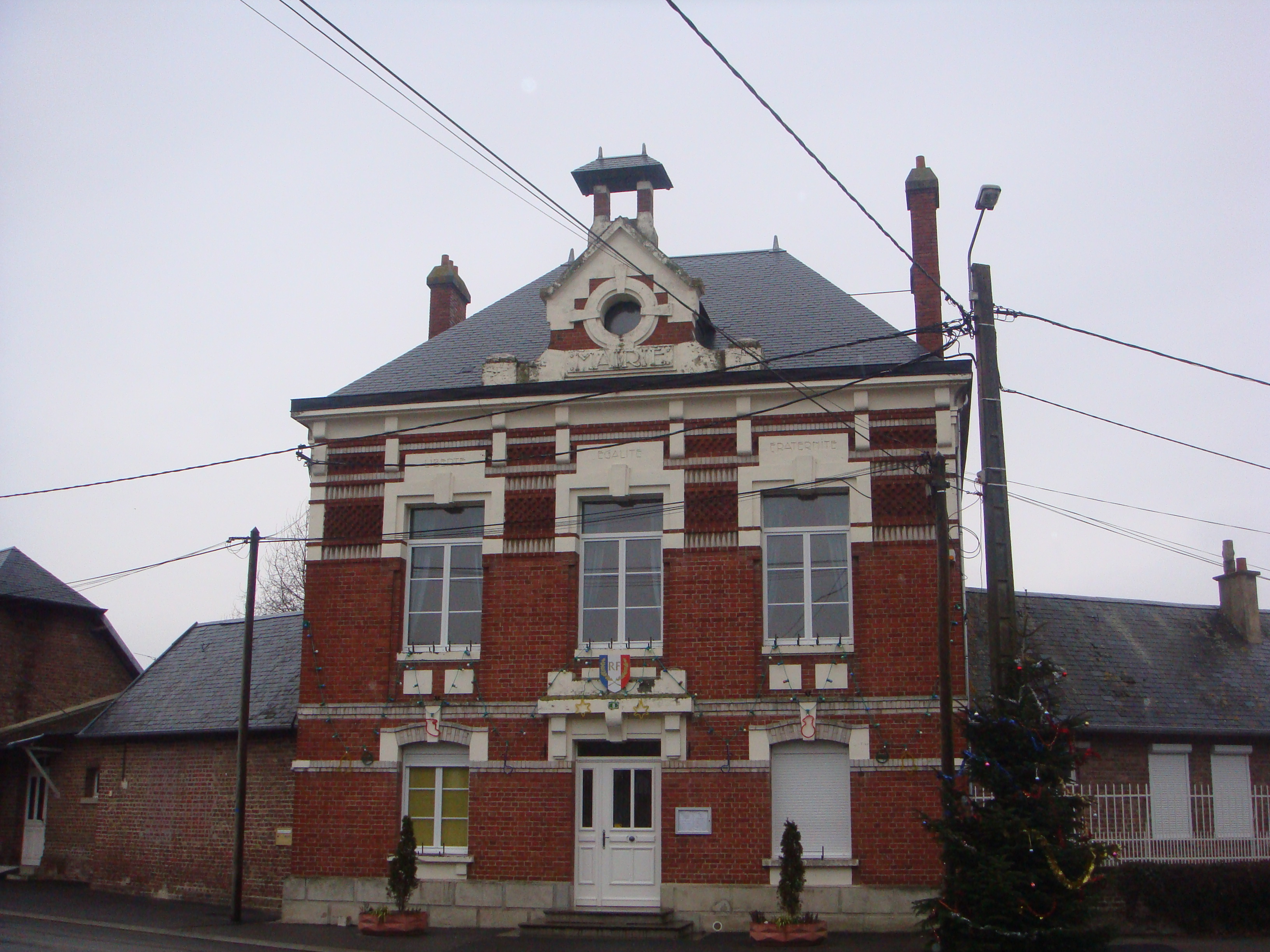
- Town hall
- Location of Remies
- Location within France Location within Hauts-de-France
- Coordinates: 49°40′47″N 3°31′16″E
- Country: France
- Region: Hauts-de-France
- Department: Aisne
- Arrondissement: Laon
- Canton: Marle
- Intercommunality: Pays de la Serre

Government
  - Mayor (2026–32): Bernard Collet
- Area^{1}: 8.98 km^{2} (3.47 sq mi)
- Elevation: 56 m (184 ft)
- Highest elevation: 88 m (289 ft)
- Lowest elevation: 52 m (171 ft)
- Population (2023): 241
  - Density: 26.8/km^{2} (69.5/sq mi)
- Time zone: UTC+01:00 (CET)
  - Summer (DST): UTC+02:00 (CEST)
- INSEE/Postal code: 02638 /02270
- ^{1} French Land Register data, which excludes lakes, ponds, glaciers > 1 km^{2} (0.386 sq mi or 247 acres) and river estuaries.

Remies (French pronunciation: [ʁəmi]) is a commune in the Aisne department in Hauts-de-France in northern France.

== Population ==
Historical population
Year	Pop.	±% p.a.
1968	272	—
1975	245	−1.48%
1982	243	−0.12%
1990	220	−1.24%
1999	230	+0.50%
2007	240	+0.53%
2012	238	−0.17%
2017	235	−0.25%
2023	241	+0.42%
Source: INSEE

== See also ==
- Communes of the Aisne department
