= Crécy-sur-Serre =

- Commune
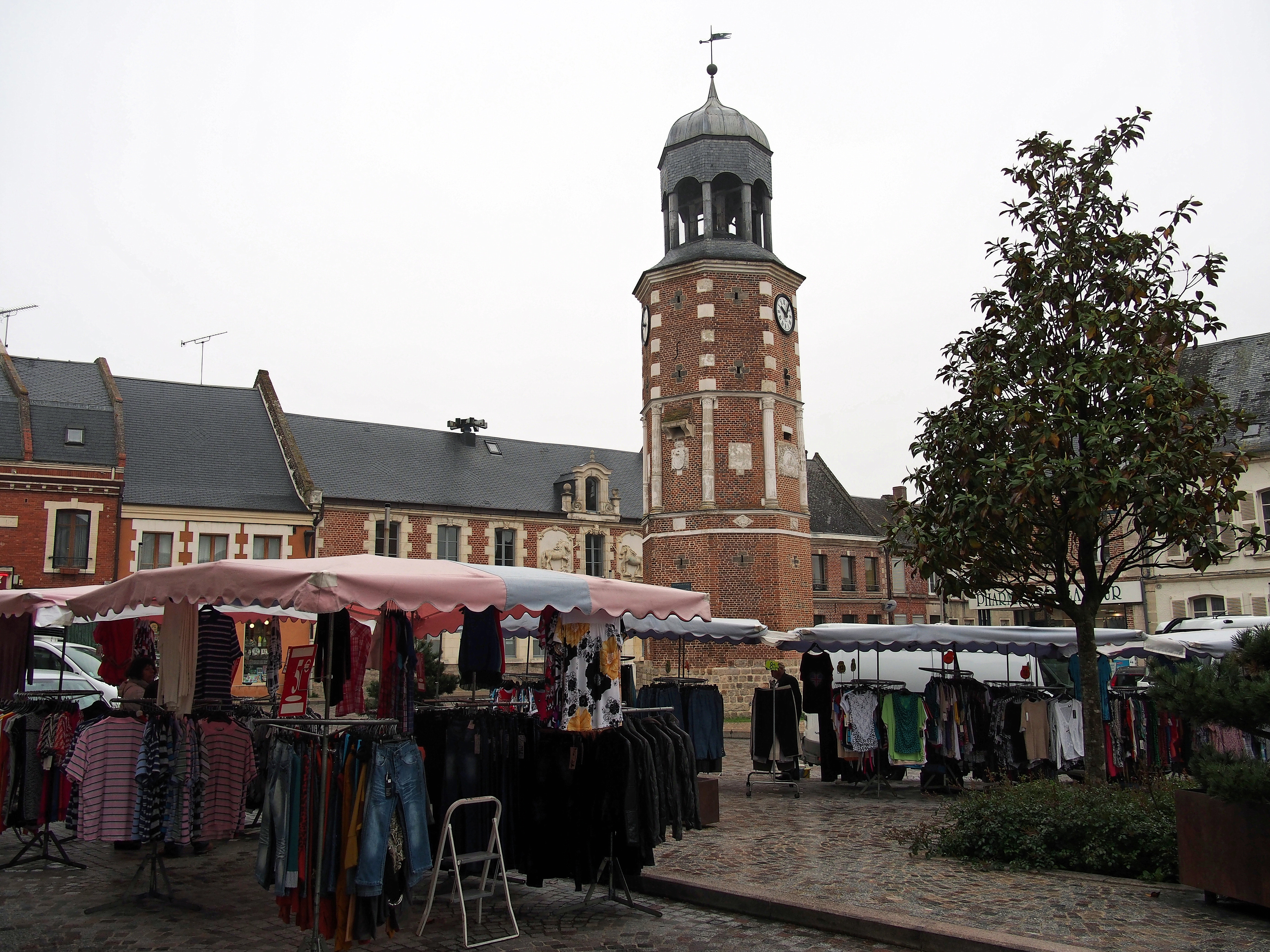
- The old belfry of Crécy-sur-Serre

- Coat of arms
- Location of Crécy-sur-Serre
- Location within France Location within Hauts-de-France
- Coordinates: 49°41′52″N 3°37′24″E
- Country: France
- Region: Hauts-de-France
- Department: Aisne
- Arrondissement: Laon
- Canton: Marle
- Intercommunality: Pays de la Serre

Government
  - Mayor (2026–32): Bertrand Jonneaux
- Area^{1}: 17.9 km^{2} (6.9 sq mi)
- Elevation: 62 m (203 ft)
- Highest elevation: 133 m (436 ft)
- Lowest elevation: 57 m (187 ft)
- Population (2023): 1,472
  - Density: 82.2/km^{2} (213/sq mi)
- Time zone: UTC+01:00 (CET)
  - Summer (DST): UTC+02:00 (CEST)
- INSEE/Postal code: 02237 /02270
- ^{1} French Land Register data, which excludes lakes, ponds, glaciers > 1 km^{2} (0.386 sq mi or 247 acres) and river estuaries.

Crécy-sur-Serre (French pronunciation: [kʁesi syʁ sɛʁ], literally Crécy on Serre) is a commune in the Aisne department in Hauts-de-France in northern France.

== Population ==
Historical population
Year	Pop.	±% p.a.
1968	1,598	—
1975	1,594	−0.04%
1982	1,700	+0.92%
1990	1,542	−1.21%
1999	1,550	+0.06%
2007	1,480	−0.58%
2012	1,475	−0.07%
2017	1,498	+0.31%
2023	1,472	−0.29%
Source: INSEE

== See also ==
- Communes of the Aisne department
