= Serre (river) =

River in northern France

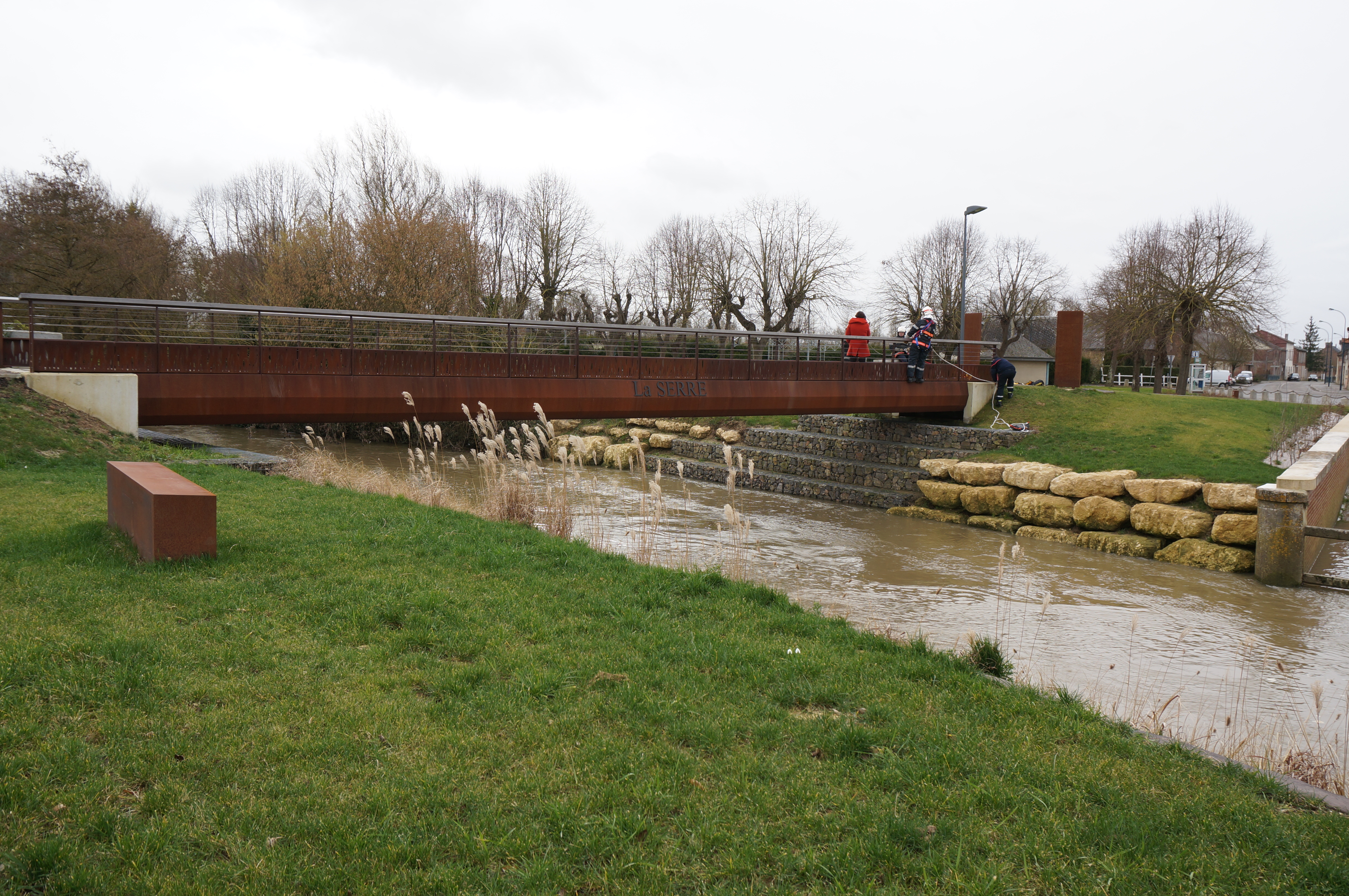

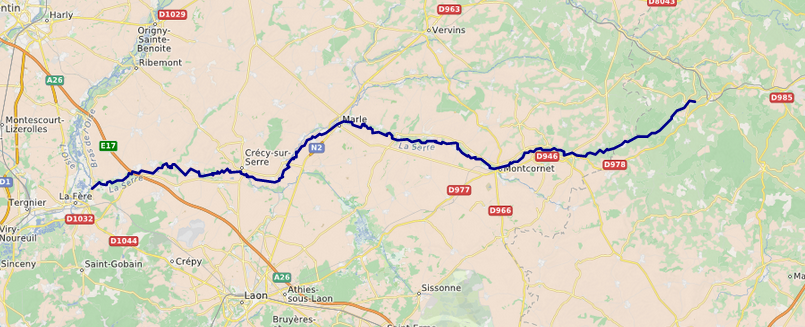

Location
- Country: France

Physical characteristics
- Source
  - location: near La Férée
  - coordinates: 49°45′49″N 4°19′00″E
- Mouth
  - location: Oise
  - coordinates: 49°40′41″N 3°23′31″E
- Length: 96 km (60 mi)

Basin features
- Progression: Oise→ Seine→ English Channel

The Serre (French pronunciation: [sɛʁ]) is a tributary of the river Oise in northern France, in the departments of Ardennes and Aisne. Its source is in the small village of La Férée, Ardennes, from which it flows west into the Aisne department. It flows through Montcornet, Marle and Crécy-sur-Serre and joins the Oise at La Fère. Its total length is 95.9 kilometres (59.6 mi).
