= 02445 =

02445 may refer to:

- Brookline, Massachusetts, U.S., a town
- Kaij, a tehsil in Maharashtra, India
- Kall, North Rhine-Westphalia, a municipality in North Rhine-Westphalia, Germany
- Luzoir, a commune in Aisne department, France
- Scheuren, a village in North Rhine-Westphalia, Germany
