= Berlise =

- Commune
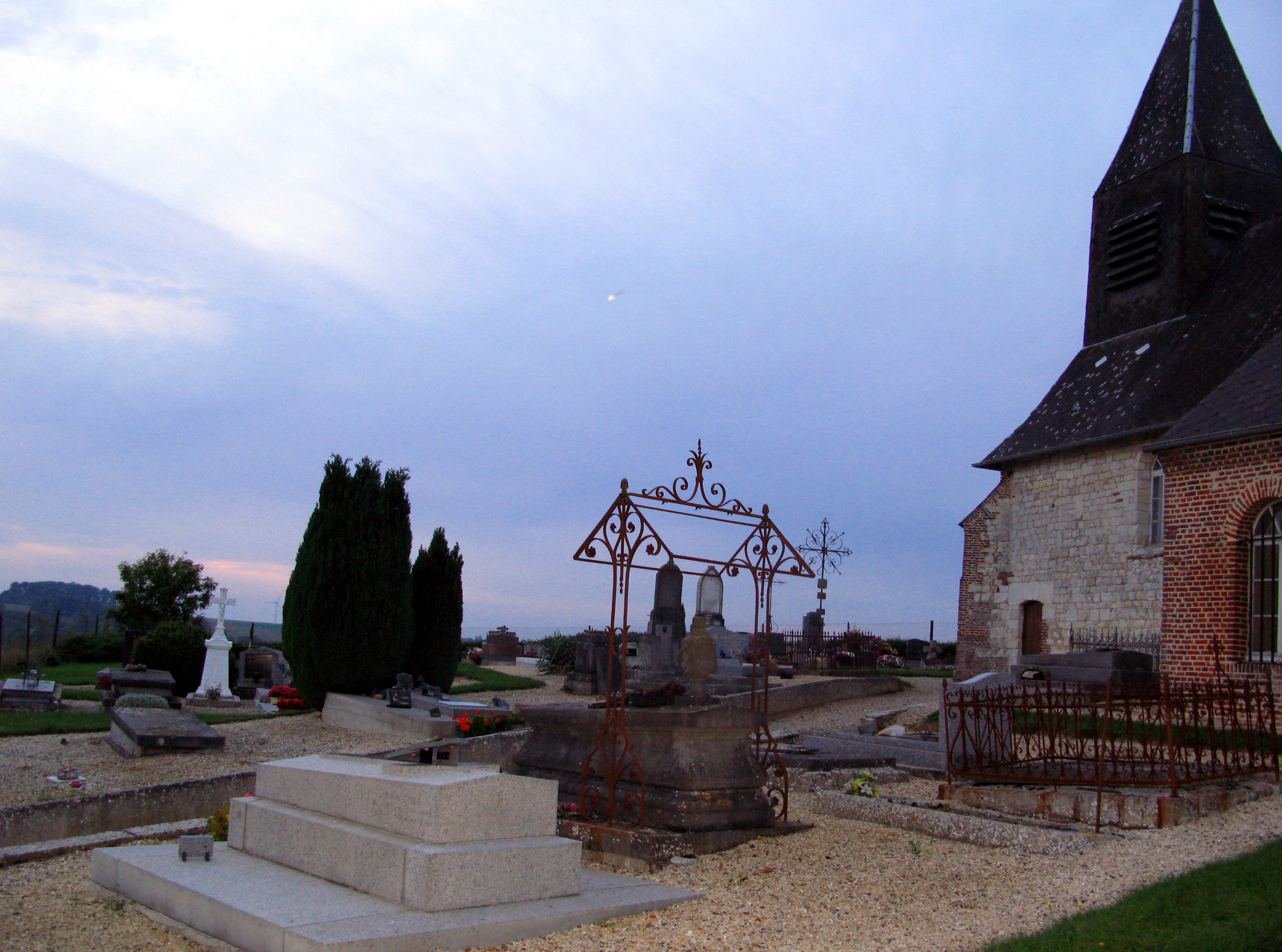
- Location of Berlise
- Location within France Location within Hauts-de-France
- Coordinates: 49°39′53″N 4°06′28″E
- Country: France
- Region: Hauts-de-France
- Department: Aisne
- Arrondissement: Vervins
- Canton: Vervins
- Intercommunality: Portes de la Thiérache

Government
  - Mayor (2026–32): Michaël Jacques
- Area^{1}: 6.59 km^{2} (2.54 sq mi)
- Elevation: 125 m (410 ft)
- Highest elevation: 192 m (630 ft)
- Lowest elevation: 127 m (417 ft)
- Population (2023): 104
  - Density: 15.8/km^{2} (40.9/sq mi)
- Time zone: UTC+01:00 (CET)
  - Summer (DST): UTC+02:00 (CEST)
- INSEE/Postal code: 02069 /02340
- ^{1} French Land Register data, which excludes lakes, ponds, glaciers > 1 km^{2} (0.386 sq mi or 247 acres) and river estuaries.

Berlise (French pronunciation: [bɛʁliz]) is a commune in the department of Aisne in Hauts-de-France in northern France.

== Population ==
Historical population
| Year | Pop. | ±% p.a. |
|---|---|---|
| 1968 | 151 | — |
| 1975 | 139 | −1.18% |
| 1982 | 128 | −1.17% |
| 1990 | 108 | −2.10% |
| 1999 | 100 | −0.85% |
| 2007 | 121 | +2.41% |
| 2012 | 123 | +0.33% |
| 2017 | 111 | −2.03% |
| 2023 | 104 | −1.08% |
Source: INSEE

== See also ==
- Communes of the Aisne department
