= Raillimont =

- Commune
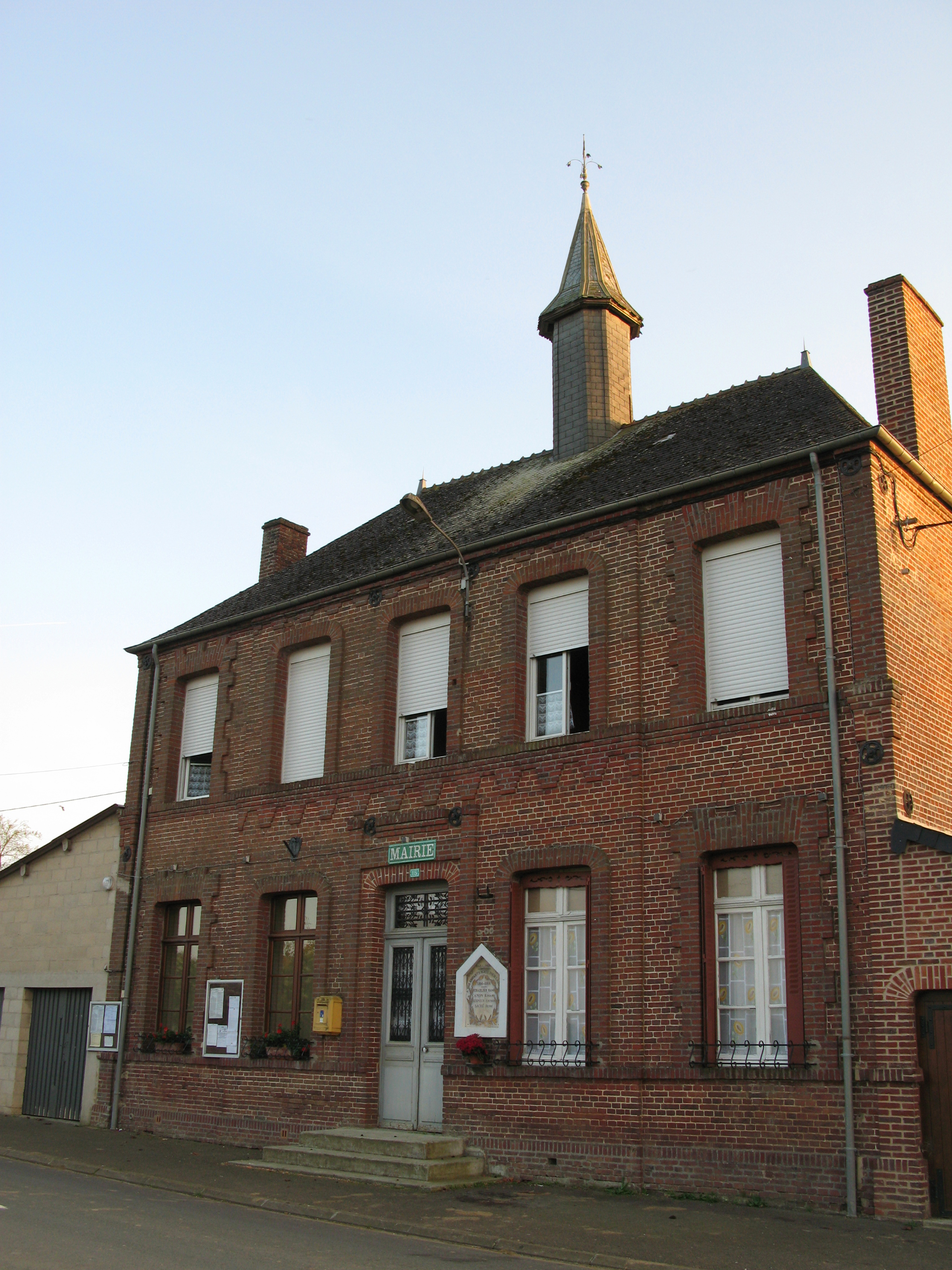
- Town hall
- Location of Raillimont
- Location within France Location within Hauts-de-France
- Coordinates: 49°42′21″N 4°09′17″E
- Country: France
- Region: Hauts-de-France
- Department: Aisne
- Arrondissement: Vervins
- Canton: Vervins
- Intercommunality: Portes de la Thiérache

Government
  - Mayor (2026–32): Monique Loriette
- Area^{1}: 4.9 km^{2} (1.9 sq mi)
- Elevation: 147 m (482 ft)
- Highest elevation: 224 m (735 ft)
- Lowest elevation: 139 m (456 ft)
- Population (2023): 89
  - Density: 18/km^{2} (47/sq mi)
- Time zone: UTC+01:00 (CET)
  - Summer (DST): UTC+02:00 (CEST)
- INSEE/Postal code: 02634 /02360
- ^{1} French Land Register data, which excludes lakes, ponds, glaciers > 1 km^{2} (0.386 sq mi or 247 acres) and river estuaries.

Raillimont (French pronunciation: [ʁajimɔ̃]) is a commune in the Aisne department in Hauts-de-France in northern France.

== Population ==
Historical population
Year	Pop.	±% p.a.
1968	85	—
1975	72	−2.34%
1982	83	+2.05%
1990	86	+0.44%
1999	77	−1.22%
2007	85	+1.24%
2012	82	−0.72%
2017	79	−0.74%
2023	89	+2.01%
Source: INSEE

== See also ==
- Communes of the Aisne department
