= Morgny-en-Thiérache =

- Commune
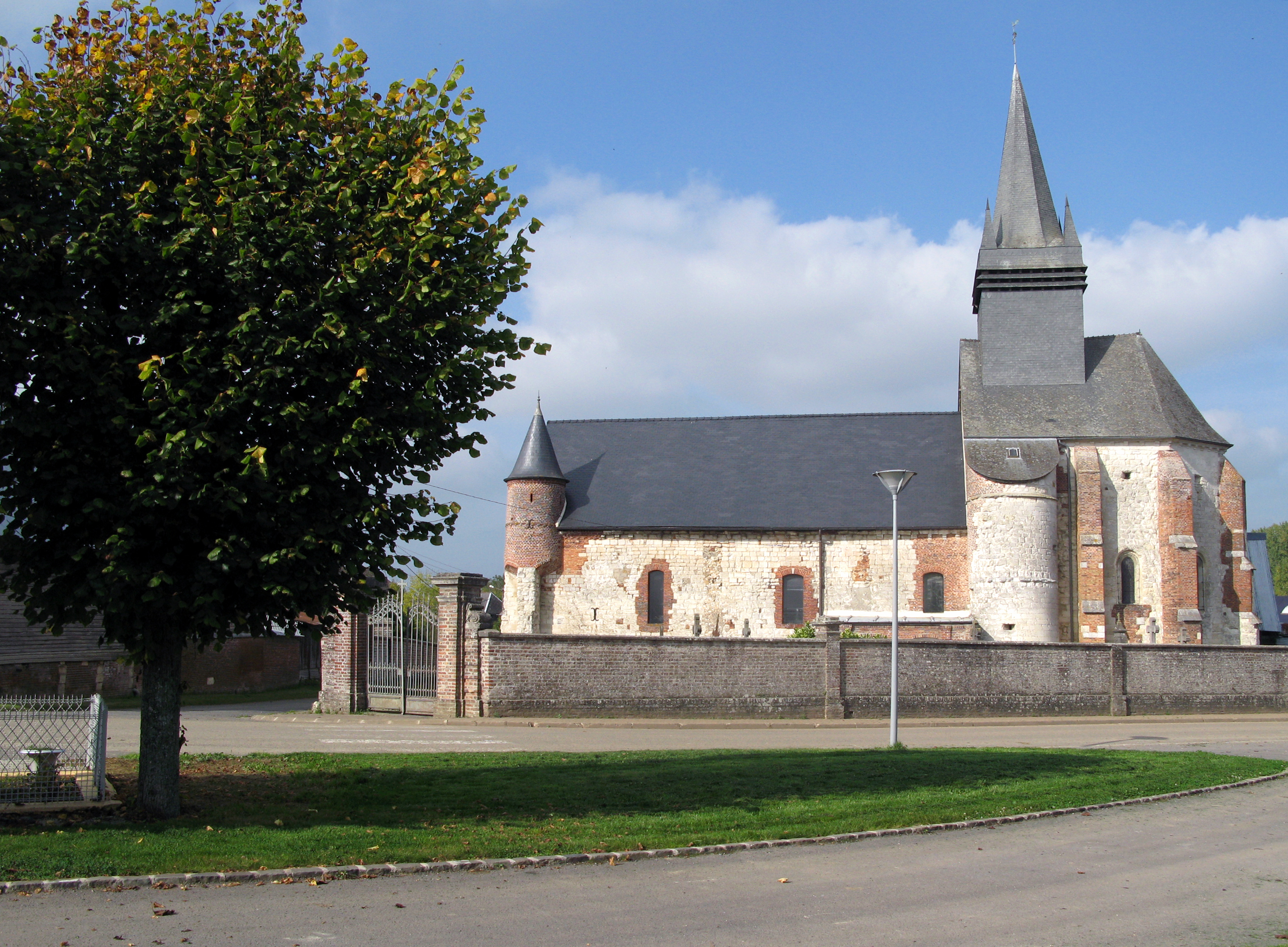
- The church of Morgny-en-Thiérache
- Location of Morgny-en-Thiérache
- Location within France Location within Hauts-de-France
- Coordinates: 49°45′37″N 4°04′43″E
- Country: France
- Region: Hauts-de-France
- Department: Aisne
- Arrondissement: Vervins
- Canton: Vervins
- Intercommunality: Portes de la Thiérache

Government
  - Mayor (2026–32): Hervé Leclercq
- Area^{1}: 6.99 km^{2} (2.70 sq mi)
- Elevation: 160 m (520 ft)
- Highest elevation: 217 m (712 ft)
- Lowest elevation: 147 m (482 ft)
- Population (2023): 98
  - Density: 14/km^{2} (36/sq mi)
- Time zone: UTC+01:00 (CET)
  - Summer (DST): UTC+02:00 (CEST)
- INSEE/Postal code: 02526 /02360
- ^{1} French Land Register data, which excludes lakes, ponds, glaciers > 1 km^{2} (0.386 sq mi or 247 acres) and river estuaries.

Morgny-en-Thiérache (French pronunciation: [mɔʁɲi ɑ̃ tjeʁaʃ], literally Morgny in Thiérache) is a commune in the Aisne department in Hauts-de-France in northern France.

== Population ==
Historical population
Year	Pop.	±% p.a.
1968	166	—
1975	162	−0.35%
1982	154	−0.72%
1990	110	−4.12%
1999	96	−1.50%
2007	98	+0.26%
2012	104	+1.20%
2017	89	−3.07%
2023	98	+1.62%
Source: INSEE

== See also ==
- Communes of the Aisne department
