= Vincy-Reuil-et-Magny =

- Commune
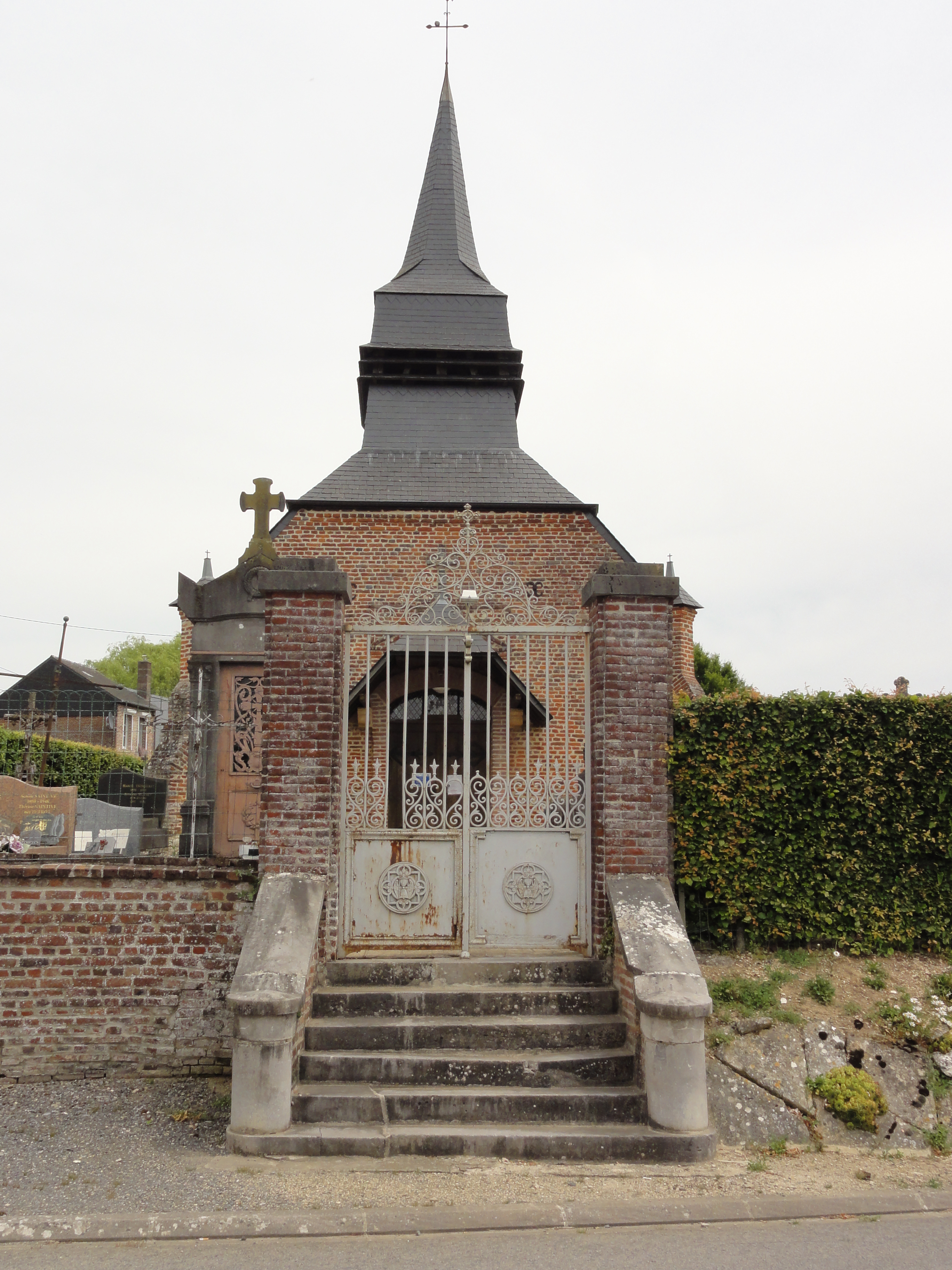
- The church of Reuil
- Location of Vincy-Reuil-et-Magny
- Location within France Location within Hauts-de-France
- Coordinates: 49°43′06″N 4°03′32″E
- Country: France
- Region: Hauts-de-France
- Department: Aisne
- Arrondissement: Vervins
- Canton: Vervins

Government
  - Mayor (2026–32): David Schumers
- Area^{1}: 11.78 km^{2} (4.55 sq mi)
- Elevation: 137 m (449 ft)
- Highest elevation: 203 m (666 ft)
- Lowest elevation: 112 m (367 ft)
- Population (2023): 101
  - Density: 8.57/km^{2} (22.2/sq mi)
- Time zone: UTC+01:00 (CET)
  - Summer (DST): UTC+02:00 (CEST)
- INSEE/Postal code: 02819 /02340
- ^{1} French Land Register data, which excludes lakes, ponds, glaciers > 1 km^{2} (0.386 sq mi or 247 acres) and river estuaries.

Vincy-Reuil-et-Magny (French pronunciation: [vɛ̃si ʁœj e maɲi]) is a commune in the Aisne department in Hauts-de-France in northern France. It is situated 35 km (22 mi) west of Laon.

== Population ==
Historical population
Year	Pop.	±% p.a.
1968	170	—
1975	190	+1.60%
1982	149	−3.41%
1990	140	−0.78%
1999	144	+0.31%
2007	128	−1.46%
2012	126	−0.31%
2017	117	−1.47%
2023	101	−2.42%
Source: INSEE

== See also ==
- Communes of the Aisne department
