= Nampcelles-la-Cour =

- Commune
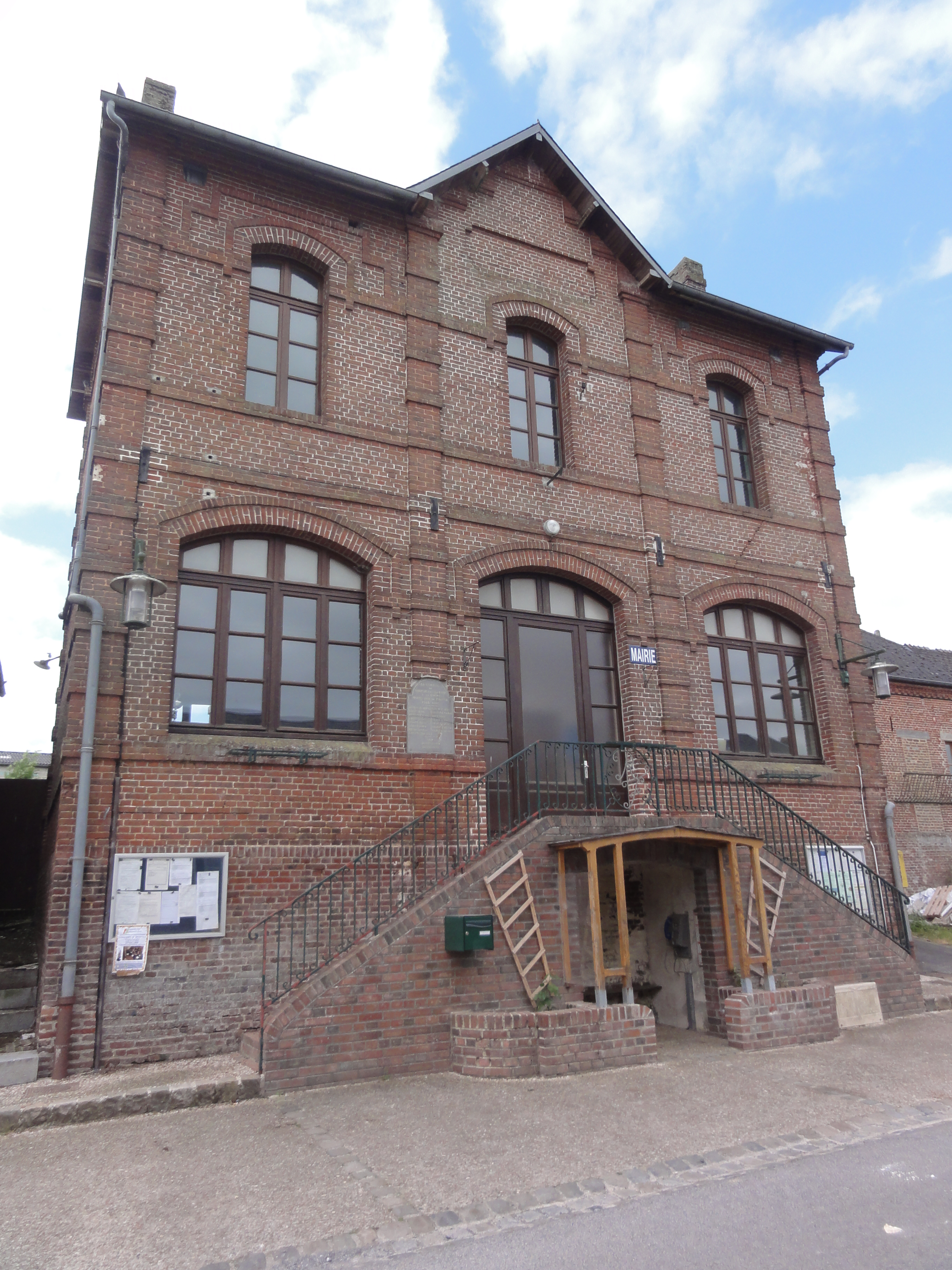
- The town hall of Nampcelles-la-Cour
- Location of Nampcelles-la-Cour
- Location within France Location within Hauts-de-France
- Coordinates: 49°46′45″N 4°00′14″E
- Country: France
- Region: Hauts-de-France
- Department: Aisne
- Arrondissement: Vervins
- Canton: Vervins
- Intercommunality: Thiérache du Centre

Government
  - Mayor (2026–32): Alain Guillaume
- Area^{1}: 10.89 km^{2} (4.20 sq mi)
- Elevation: 133 m (436 ft)
- Highest elevation: 207 m (679 ft)
- Lowest elevation: 122 m (400 ft)
- Population (2023): 115
  - Density: 10.6/km^{2} (27.4/sq mi)
- Time zone: UTC+01:00 (CET)
  - Summer (DST): UTC+02:00 (CEST)
- INSEE/Postal code: 02535 /02140
- ^{1} French Land Register data, which excludes lakes, ponds, glaciers > 1 km^{2} (0.386 sq mi or 247 acres) and river estuaries.

Nampcelles-la-Cour (French pronunciation: [nɑ̃sɛl la kuʁ]) is a commune in the Aisne department in Hauts-de-France in northern France.

== Population ==
Historical population
Year	Pop.	±% p.a.
1968	188	—
1975	167	−1.68%
1982	152	−1.34%
1990	141	−0.93%
1999	133	−0.65%
2007	135	+0.19%
2012	131	−0.60%
2017	118	−2.07%
2023	115	−0.43%
Source: INSEE

== See also ==
- Communes of the Aisne department
