= Thenailles =

Commune in Hauts-de-France, France

- Commune
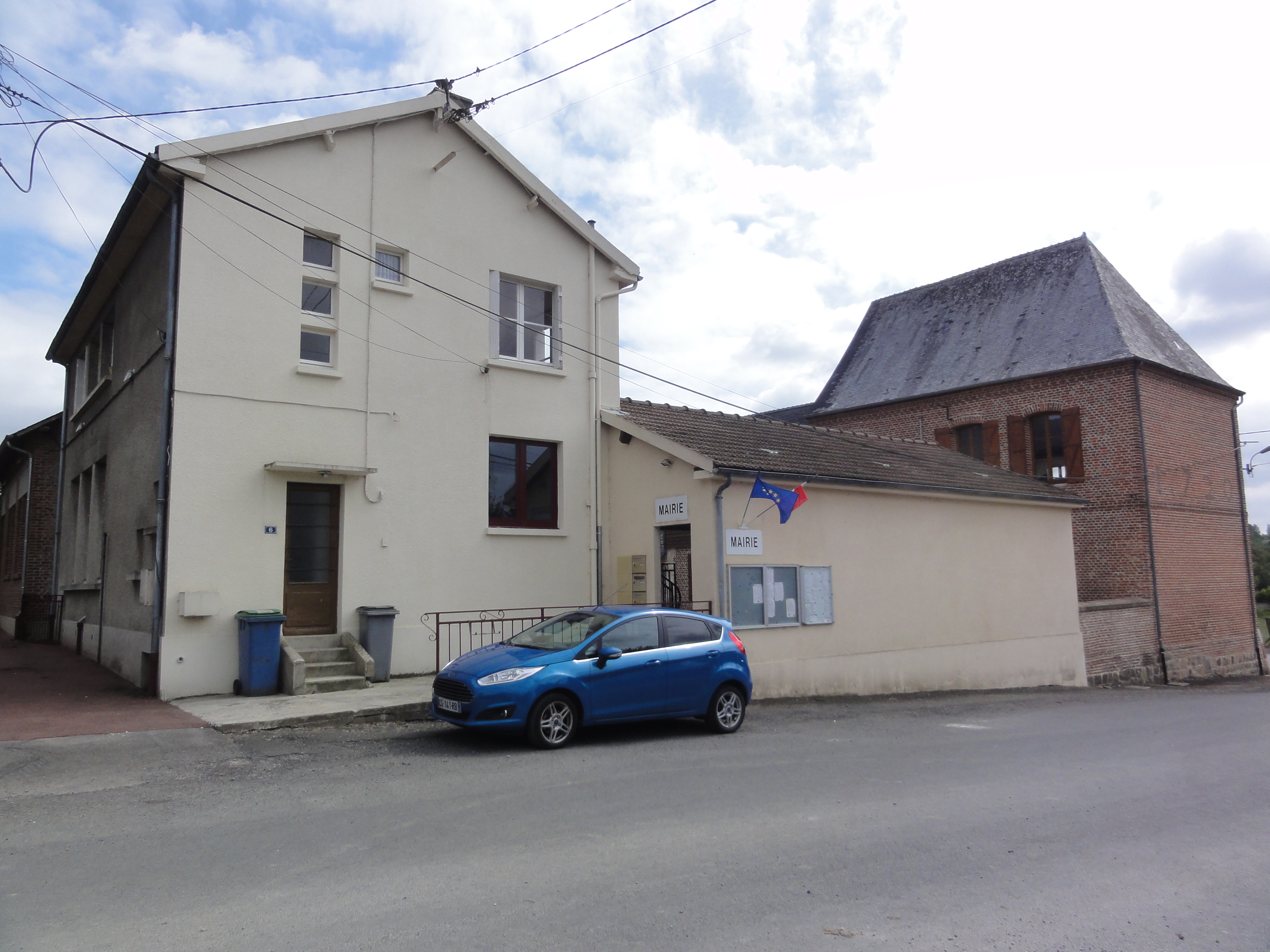
- The town hall of Thenailles

- Coat of arms
- Location of Thenailles
- Location within France Location within Hauts-de-France
- Coordinates: 49°49′15″N 3°56′23″E
- Country: France
- Region: Hauts-de-France
- Department: Aisne
- Arrondissement: Vervins
- Canton: Vervins
- Intercommunality: Thiérache du Centre

Government
  - Mayor (2026–32): Christophe Boury
- Area^{1}: 16.43 km^{2} (6.34 sq mi)
- Elevation: 206 m (676 ft)
- Highest elevation: 209 m (686 ft)
- Lowest elevation: 114 m (374 ft)
- Population (2023): 220
  - Density: 13/km^{2} (35/sq mi)
- Time zone: UTC+01:00 (CET)
  - Summer (DST): UTC+02:00 (CEST)
- INSEE/Postal code: 02740 /02140
- ^{1} French Land Register data, which excludes lakes, ponds, glaciers > 1 km^{2} (0.386 sq mi or 247 acres) and river estuaries.

Thenailles (French pronunciation: [tənaj]) is a commune in the Aisne department in Hauts-de-France in northern France.

== Population ==
Historical population
Year	Pop.	±% p.a.
1968	336	—
1975	296	−1.79%
1982	293	−0.15%
1990	303	+0.42%
1999	284	−0.72%
2007	258	−1.19%
2012	250	−0.63%
2017	220	−2.52%
2023	220	+0.00%
Source: INSEE

== See also ==
- Communes of the Aisne department
