= Haution =

- Commune
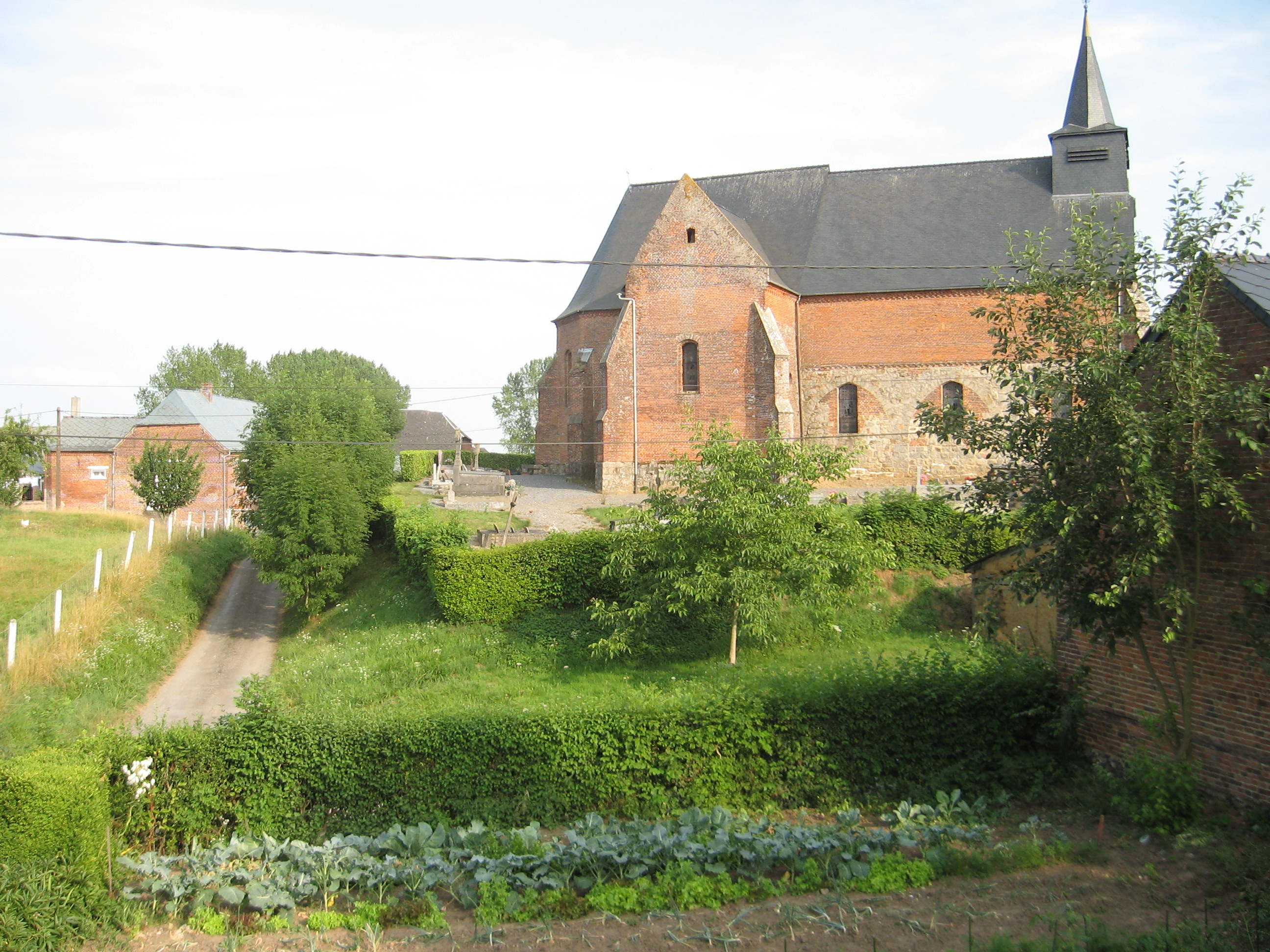
- The church of Haution
- Location of Haution
- Location within France Location within Hauts-de-France
- Coordinates: 49°52′02″N 3°50′28″E
- Country: France
- Region: Hauts-de-France
- Department: Aisne
- Arrondissement: Vervins
- Canton: Vervins
- Intercommunality: Thiérache du Centre

Government
  - Mayor (2026–32): Bernard Faucheux
- Area^{1}: 9.34 km^{2} (3.61 sq mi)
- Elevation: 127 m (417 ft)
- Highest elevation: 199 m (653 ft)
- Lowest elevation: 130 m (430 ft)
- Population (2023): 131
  - Density: 14.0/km^{2} (36.3/sq mi)
- Time zone: UTC+01:00 (CET)
  - Summer (DST): UTC+02:00 (CEST)
- INSEE/Postal code: 02377 /02140
- ^{1} French Land Register data, which excludes lakes, ponds, glaciers > 1 km^{2} (0.386 sq mi or 247 acres) and river estuaries.

Haution is a commune in the Aisne department in Hauts-de-France in northern France.

== Population ==
Historical population
| Year | Pop. | ±% p.a. |
|---|---|---|
| 1968 | 202 | — |
| 1975 | 157 | −3.54% |
| 1982 | 145 | −1.13% |
| 1990 | 184 | +3.02% |
| 1999 | 153 | −2.03% |
| 2007 | 145 | −0.67% |
| 2012 | 150 | +0.68% |
| 2017 | 144 | −0.81% |
| 2023 | 131 | −1.56% |
Source: INSEE

== See also ==
- Communes of the Aisne department
