= Saint-Algis =

- Commune
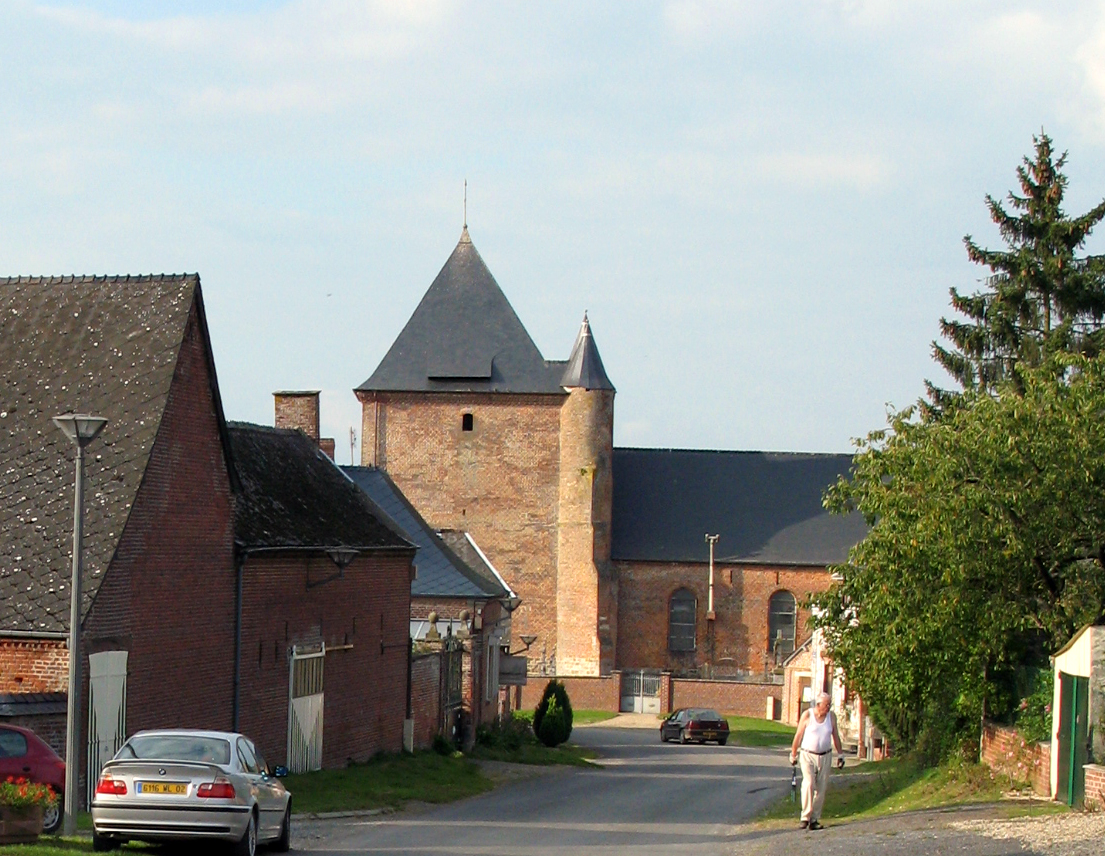
- The church of Saint-Algis
- Location of Saint-Algis
- Location within France Location within Hauts-de-France
- Coordinates: 49°53′55″N 3°49′29″E
- Country: France
- Region: Hauts-de-France
- Department: Aisne
- Arrondissement: Vervins
- Canton: Vervins
- Intercommunality: Thiérache du Centre

Government
  - Mayor (2026–32): Martine Basse
- Area^{1}: 6.89 km^{2} (2.66 sq mi)
- Elevation: 180 m (590 ft)
- Highest elevation: 191 m (627 ft)
- Lowest elevation: 112 m (367 ft)
- Population (2023): 148
  - Density: 21.5/km^{2} (55.6/sq mi)
- Time zone: UTC+01:00 (CET)
  - Summer (DST): UTC+02:00 (CEST)
- INSEE/Postal code: 02670 /02260
- ^{1} French Land Register data, which excludes lakes, ponds, glaciers > 1 km^{2} (0.386 sq mi or 247 acres) and river estuaries.

Saint-Algis is a commune in the Aisne department in Hauts-de-France in northern France.

== Population ==
Historical population
Year	Pop.	±% p.a.
1968	232	—
1975	207	−1.62%
1982	182	−1.82%
1990	174	−0.56%
1999	146	−1.93%
2007	156	+0.83%
2012	161	+0.63%
2017	156	−0.63%
2023	148	−0.87%
Source: INSEE

== See also ==
- Communes of the Aisne department
