= Landouzy-la-Cour =

- Commune
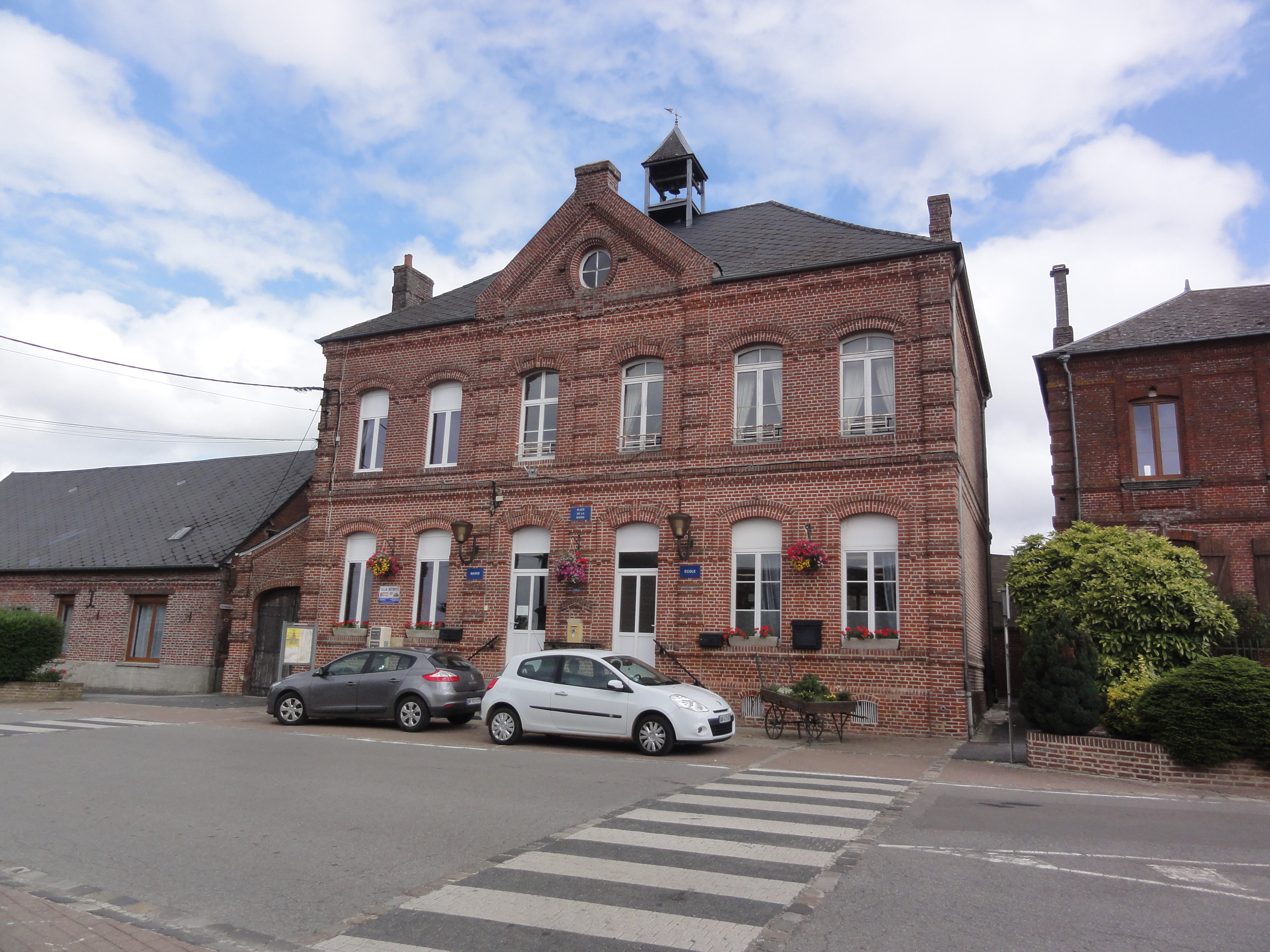
- The town hall and school of Landouzy-la-Cour
- Location of Landouzy-la-Cour
- Location within France Location within Hauts-de-France
- Coordinates: 49°50′54″N 3°59′04″E
- Country: France
- Region: Hauts-de-France
- Department: Aisne
- Arrondissement: Vervins
- Canton: Vervins
- Intercommunality: Thiérache du Centre

Government
  - Mayor (2026–32): Claude Payan
- Area^{1}: 10.12 km^{2} (3.91 sq mi)
- Elevation: 180 m (590 ft)
- Highest elevation: 221 m (725 ft)
- Lowest elevation: 150 m (490 ft)
- Population (2023): 167
  - Density: 16.5/km^{2} (42.7/sq mi)
- Time zone: UTC+01:00 (CET)
  - Summer (DST): UTC+02:00 (CEST)
- INSEE/Postal code: 02404 /02140
- ^{1} French Land Register data, which excludes lakes, ponds, glaciers > 1 km^{2} (0.386 sq mi or 247 acres) and river estuaries.

Landouzy-la-Cour (French pronunciation: [lɑ̃duzi la kuʁ]) is a commune in the Aisne department in Hauts-de-France in northern France.

== Population ==
Historical population
Year	Pop.	±% p.a.
1968	219	—
1975	187	−2.23%
1982	169	−1.44%
1990	194	+1.74%
1999	173	−1.26%
2007	151	−1.69%
2012	188	+4.48%
2017	187	−0.11%
2023	167	−1.87%
Source: INSEE

== See also ==
- Communes of the Aisne department
