= Dolignon =

- Commune
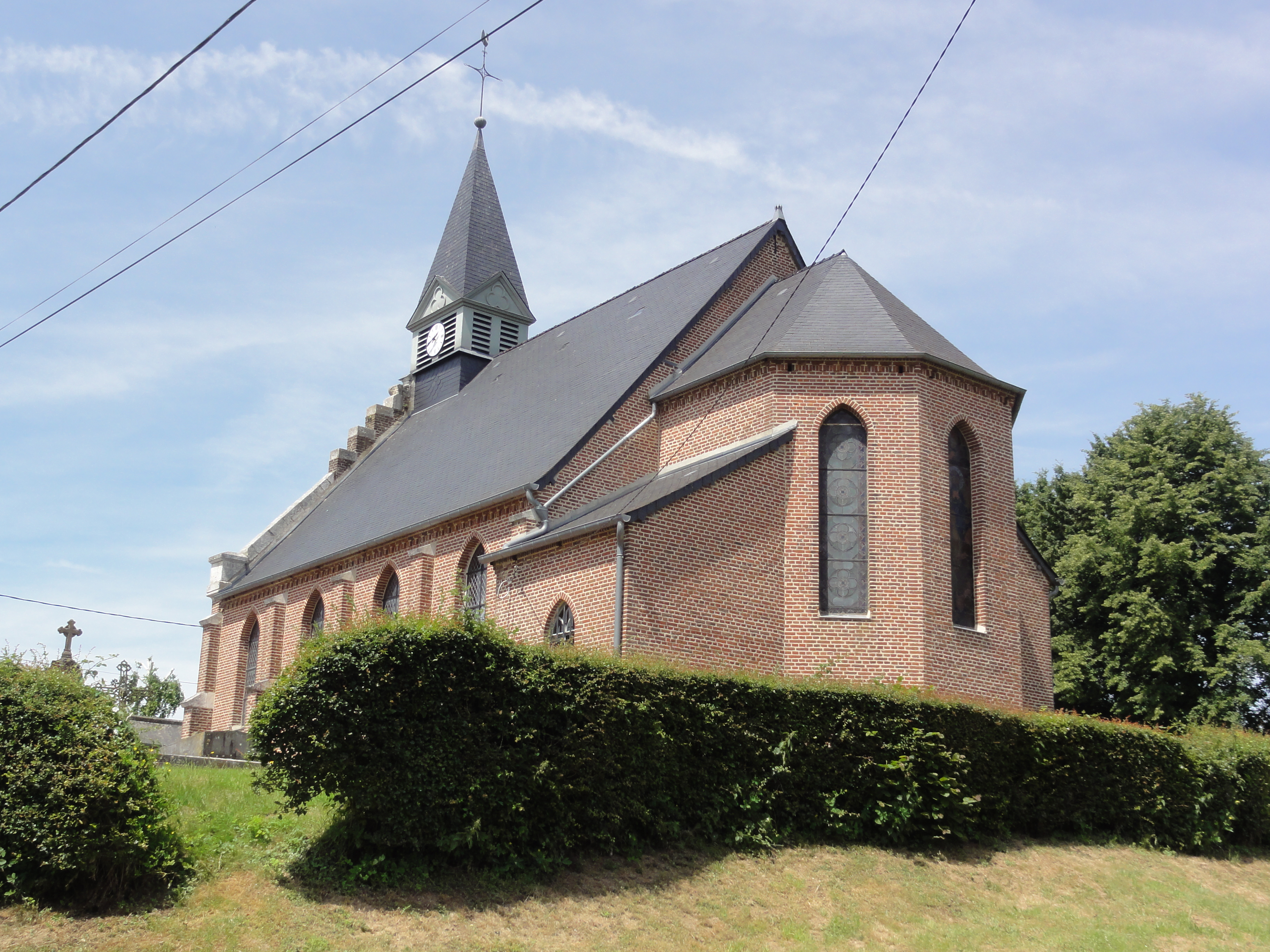
- The church of Dolignon
- Location of Dolignon
- Location within France Location within Hauts-de-France
- Coordinates: 49°43′55″N 4°05′06″E
- Country: France
- Region: Hauts-de-France
- Department: Aisne
- Arrondissement: Vervins
- Canton: Vervins
- Intercommunality: Portes de la Thiérache

Government
  - Mayor (2026–32): Corinne Bienaime
- Area^{1}: 3.38 km^{2} (1.31 sq mi)
- Elevation: 150 m (490 ft)
- Highest elevation: 213 m (699 ft)
- Lowest elevation: 126 m (413 ft)
- Population (2023): 30
  - Density: 8.9/km^{2} (23/sq mi)
- Time zone: UTC+01:00 (CET)
  - Summer (DST): UTC+02:00 (CEST)
- INSEE/Postal code: 02266 /02360
- ^{1} French Land Register data, which excludes lakes, ponds, glaciers > 1 km^{2} (0.386 sq mi or 247 acres) and river estuaries.

Dolignon (French pronunciation: [dɔliɲɔ̃]) is a commune in the Aisne department in Hauts-de-France in northern France.

== Population ==
Historical population
| Year | Pop. | ±% p.a. |
|---|---|---|
| 1968 | 84 | — |
| 1975 | 80 | −0.69% |
| 1982 | 78 | −0.36% |
| 1990 | 55 | −4.27% |
| 1999 | 45 | −2.21% |
| 2007 | 58 | +3.22% |
| 2012 | 55 | −1.06% |
| 2017 | 49 | −2.28% |
| 2023 | 30 | −7.85% |
Source: INSEE

== See also ==
- Communes of the Aisne department
