= Sommeron =

- Commune
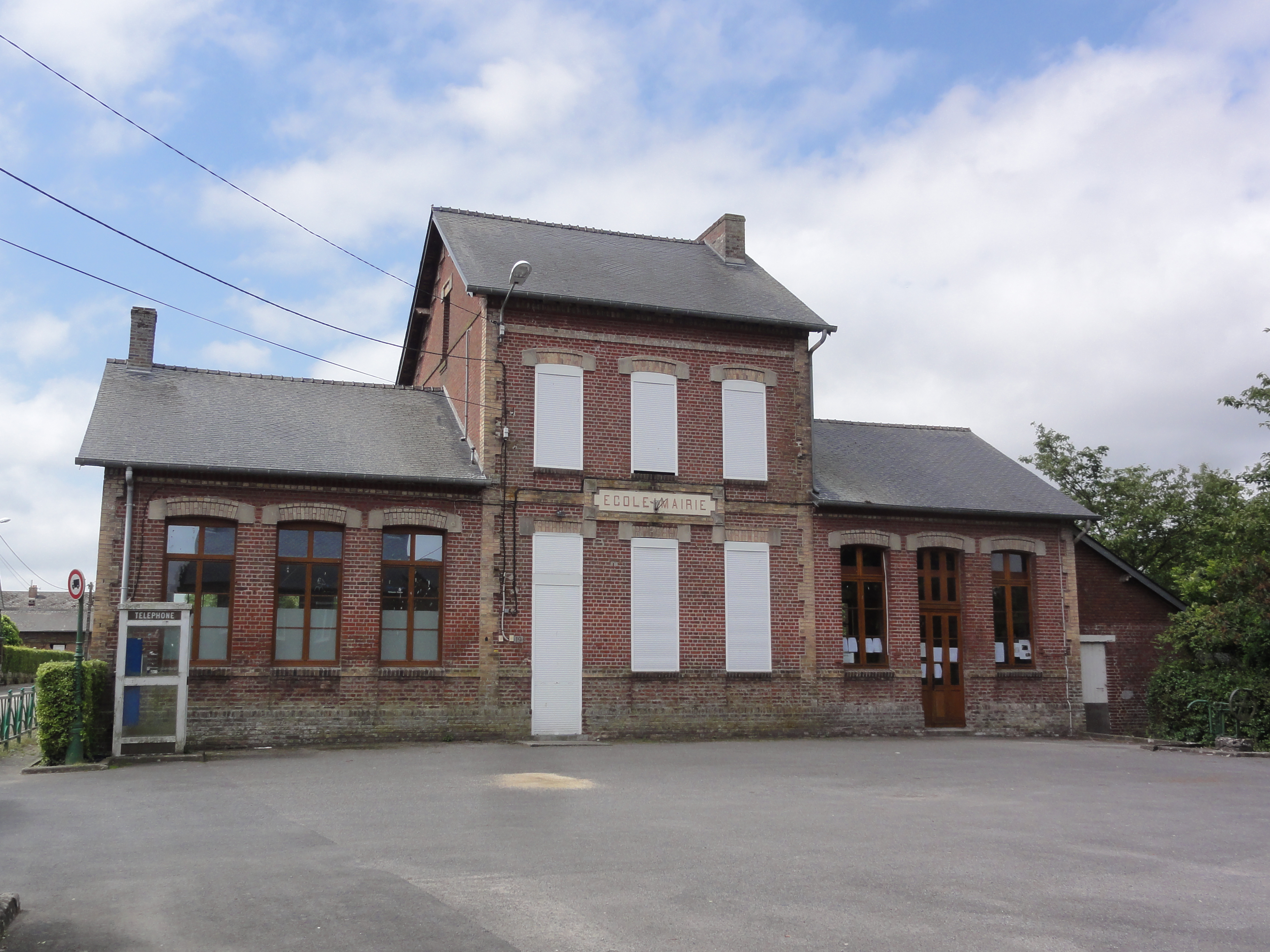
- The town hall and school of Sommeron
- Location of Sommeron
- Location within France Location within Hauts-de-France
- Coordinates: 49°57′07″N 3°56′25″E
- Country: France
- Region: Hauts-de-France
- Department: Aisne
- Arrondissement: Vervins
- Canton: Vervins
- Intercommunality: Thiérache du Centre

Government
  - Mayor (2026–32): Michaël Nicolas
- Area^{1}: 4.68 km^{2} (1.81 sq mi)
- Elevation: 228 m (748 ft)
- Highest elevation: 228 m (748 ft)
- Lowest elevation: 152 m (499 ft)
- Population (2023): 134
  - Density: 28.6/km^{2} (74.2/sq mi)
- Time zone: UTC+01:00 (CET)
  - Summer (DST): UTC+02:00 (CEST)
- INSEE/Postal code: 02725 /02260
- ^{1} French Land Register data, which excludes lakes, ponds, glaciers > 1 km^{2} (0.386 sq mi or 247 acres) and river estuaries.

Sommeron (French pronunciation: [sɔmʁɔ̃]) is a commune situated in the Aisne department in Hauts-de-France of northern France.

== Population ==
Historical population
Year	Pop.	±% p.a.
1968	181	—
1975	144	−3.21%
1982	147	+0.29%
1990	123	−2.20%
1999	122	−0.09%
2007	134	+1.18%
2012	135	+0.15%
2017	142	+1.02%
2023	134	−0.96%
Source: INSEE

== See also ==
- Communes of the Aisne department
