= Le Thuel =

- Commune
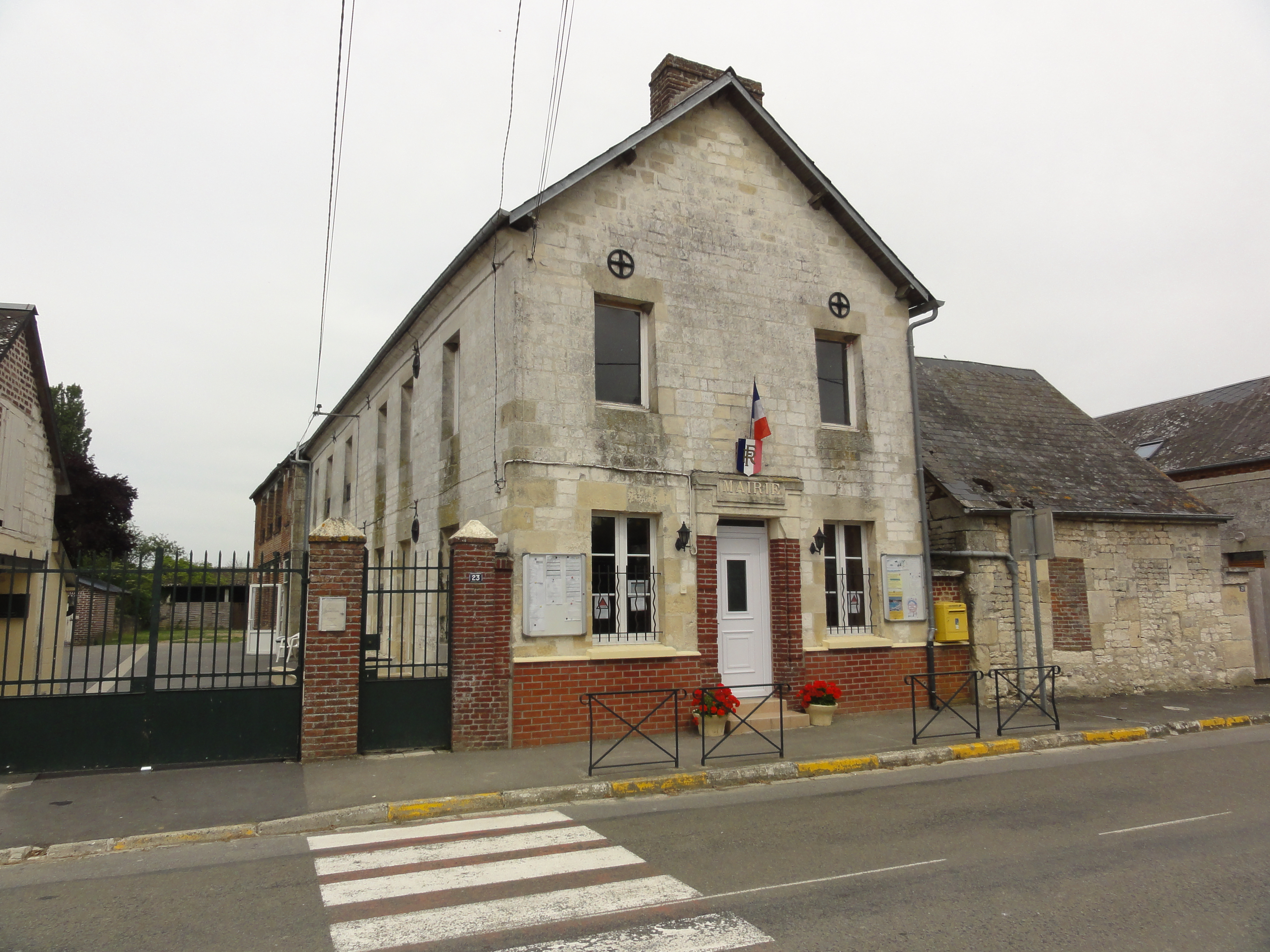
- The town hall of Le Thuel
- Location of Le Thuel
- Location within France Location within Hauts-de-France
- Coordinates: 49°39′00″N 4°04′39″E
- Country: France
- Region: Hauts-de-France
- Department: Aisne
- Arrondissement: Vervins
- Canton: Vervins
- Intercommunality: Portes de la Thiérache

Government
  - Mayor (2026–32): David Vandenhende
- Area^{1}: 7.06 km^{2} (2.73 sq mi)
- Elevation: 175 m (574 ft)
- Highest elevation: 172 m (564 ft)
- Lowest elevation: 112 m (367 ft)
- Population (2023): 158
  - Density: 22.4/km^{2} (58.0/sq mi)
- Time zone: UTC+01:00 (CET)
  - Summer (DST): UTC+02:00 (CEST)
- INSEE/Postal code: 02743 /02340
- ^{1} French Land Register data, which excludes lakes, ponds, glaciers > 1 km^{2} (0.386 sq mi or 247 acres) and river estuaries.

Le Thuel (French pronunciation: [lə tɥɛl]) is a commune in the Aisne department in Hauts-de-France in northern France.

== Population ==
Historical population
Year	Pop.	±% p.a.
1968	175	—
1975	135	−3.64%
1982	164	+2.82%
1990	154	−0.78%
1999	149	−0.37%
2007	166	+1.36%
2012	176	+1.18%
2017	168	−0.93%
2023	158	−1.02%
Source: INSEE

== See also ==
- Communes of the Aisne department
