= Soize =

- Commune
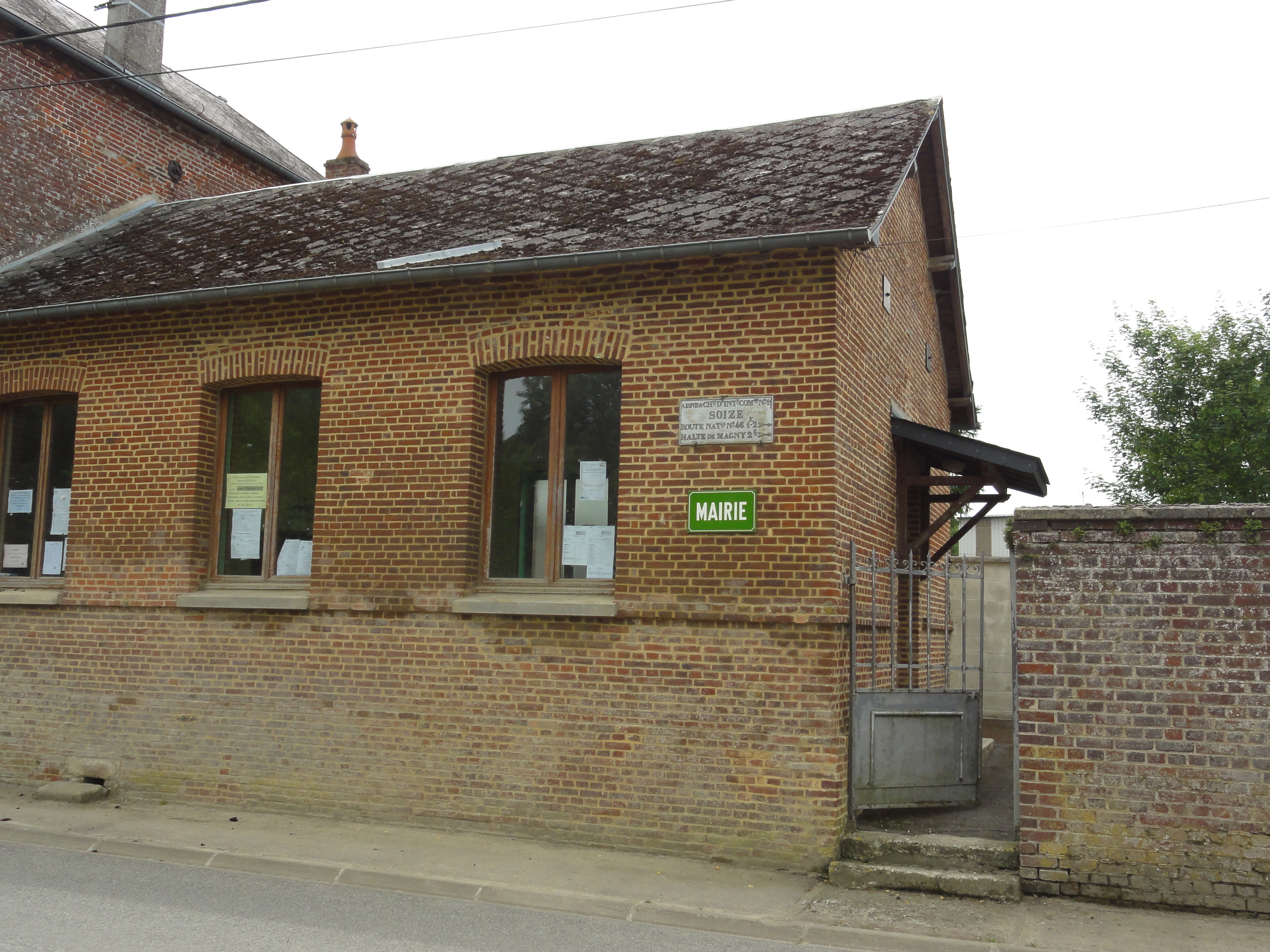
- The town hall of Soize
- Location of Soize
- Location within France Location within Hauts-de-France
- Coordinates: 49°42′06″N 4°05′07″E
- Country: France
- Region: Hauts-de-France
- Department: Aisne
- Arrondissement: Vervins
- Canton: Vervins
- Intercommunality: Portes de la Thiérache

Government
  - Mayor (2026–32): Sylvain Dhenin
- Area^{1}: 5.91 km^{2} (2.28 sq mi)
- Elevation: 285 m (935 ft)
- Highest elevation: 197 m (646 ft)
- Lowest elevation: 130 m (430 ft)
- Population (2023): 95
  - Density: 16/km^{2} (42/sq mi)
- Time zone: UTC+01:00 (CET)
  - Summer (DST): UTC+02:00 (CEST)
- INSEE/Postal code: 02723 /02340
- ^{1} French Land Register data, which excludes lakes, ponds, glaciers > 1 km^{2} (0.386 sq mi or 247 acres) and river estuaries.

Soize (French pronunciation: [swaz]) is a commune in the Aisne department in Hauts-de-France in northern France.

== Population ==
Historical population
Year	Pop.	±% p.a.
1968	156	—
1975	132	−2.36%
1982	125	−0.78%
1990	104	−2.27%
1999	106	+0.21%
2007	101	−0.60%
2012	95	−1.22%
2017	101	+1.23%
2023	95	−1.02%
Source: INSEE

== See also ==
- Communes of the Aisne department
