= Gronard =

- Commune
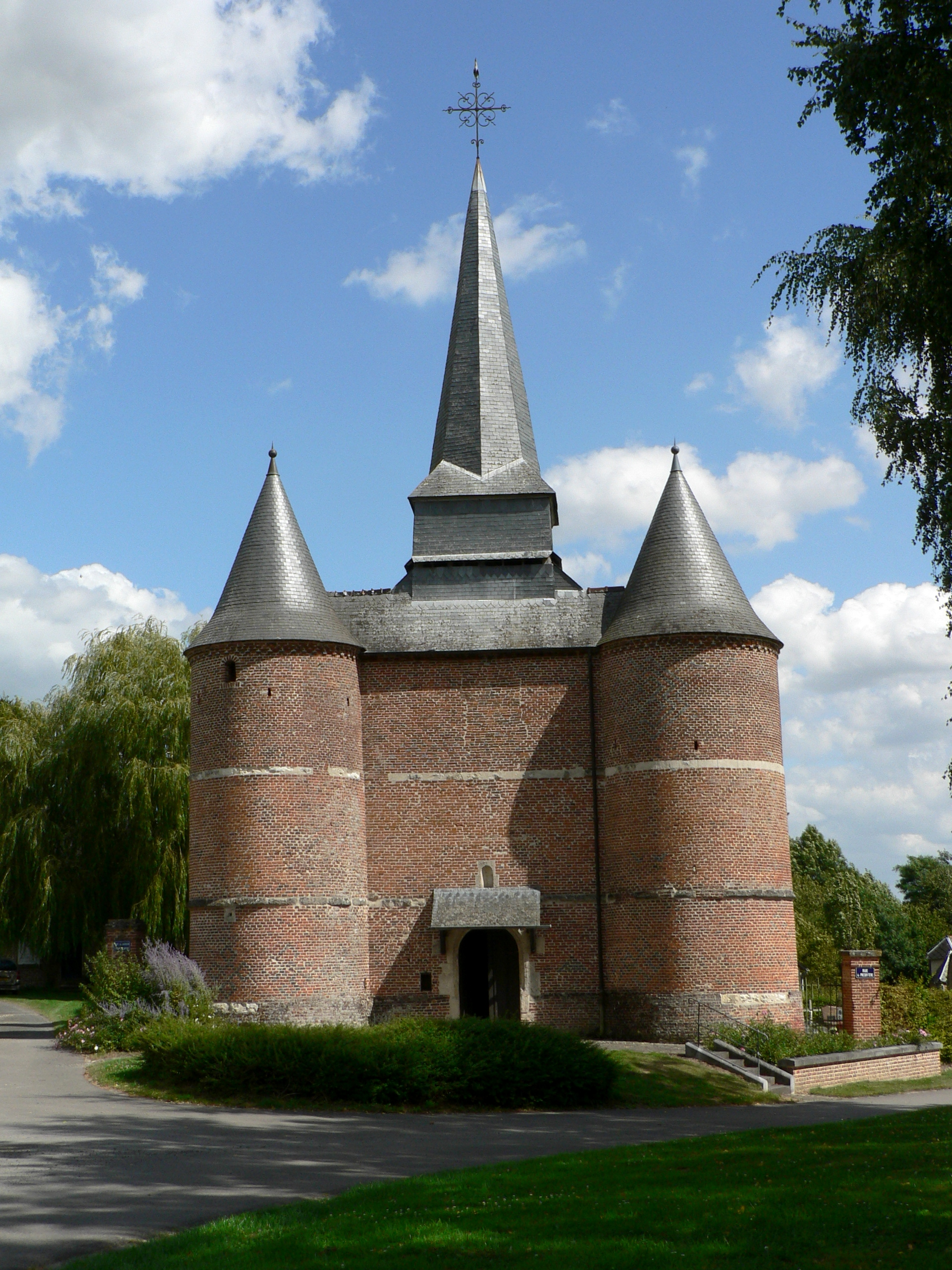
- The church of Gronard
- Location of Gronard
- Location within France Location within Hauts-de-France
- Coordinates: 49°47′38″N 3°53′05″E
- Country: France
- Region: Hauts-de-France
- Department: Aisne
- Arrondissement: Vervins
- Canton: Vervins
- Intercommunality: Thiérache du Centre

Government
  - Mayor (2026–32): Alexis De Wever
- Area^{1}: 7.1 km^{2} (2.7 sq mi)
- Elevation: 138 m (453 ft)
- Highest elevation: 190 m (620 ft)
- Lowest elevation: 100 m (330 ft)
- Population (2023): 56
  - Density: 7.9/km^{2} (20/sq mi)
- Time zone: UTC+01:00 (CET)
  - Summer (DST): UTC+02:00 (CEST)
- INSEE/Postal code: 02357 /02140
- ^{1} French Land Register data, which excludes lakes, ponds, glaciers > 1 km^{2} (0.386 sq mi or 247 acres) and river estuaries.

Gronard (French pronunciation: [ɡʁɔnaʁ]) is a commune in the Aisne department in Hauts-de-France in northern France. Its 16th century fortified church is a classified monument historique.

== Population ==
Historical population
Year	Pop.	±% p.a.
1968	108	—
1975	85	−3.36%
1982	85	+0.00%
1990	79	−0.91%
1999	78	−0.14%
2007	75	−0.49%
2012	75	+0.00%
2017	73	−0.54%
2023	56	−4.32%
Source: INSEE

== See also ==
- Communes of the Aisne department
