= Renneval =

- Commune
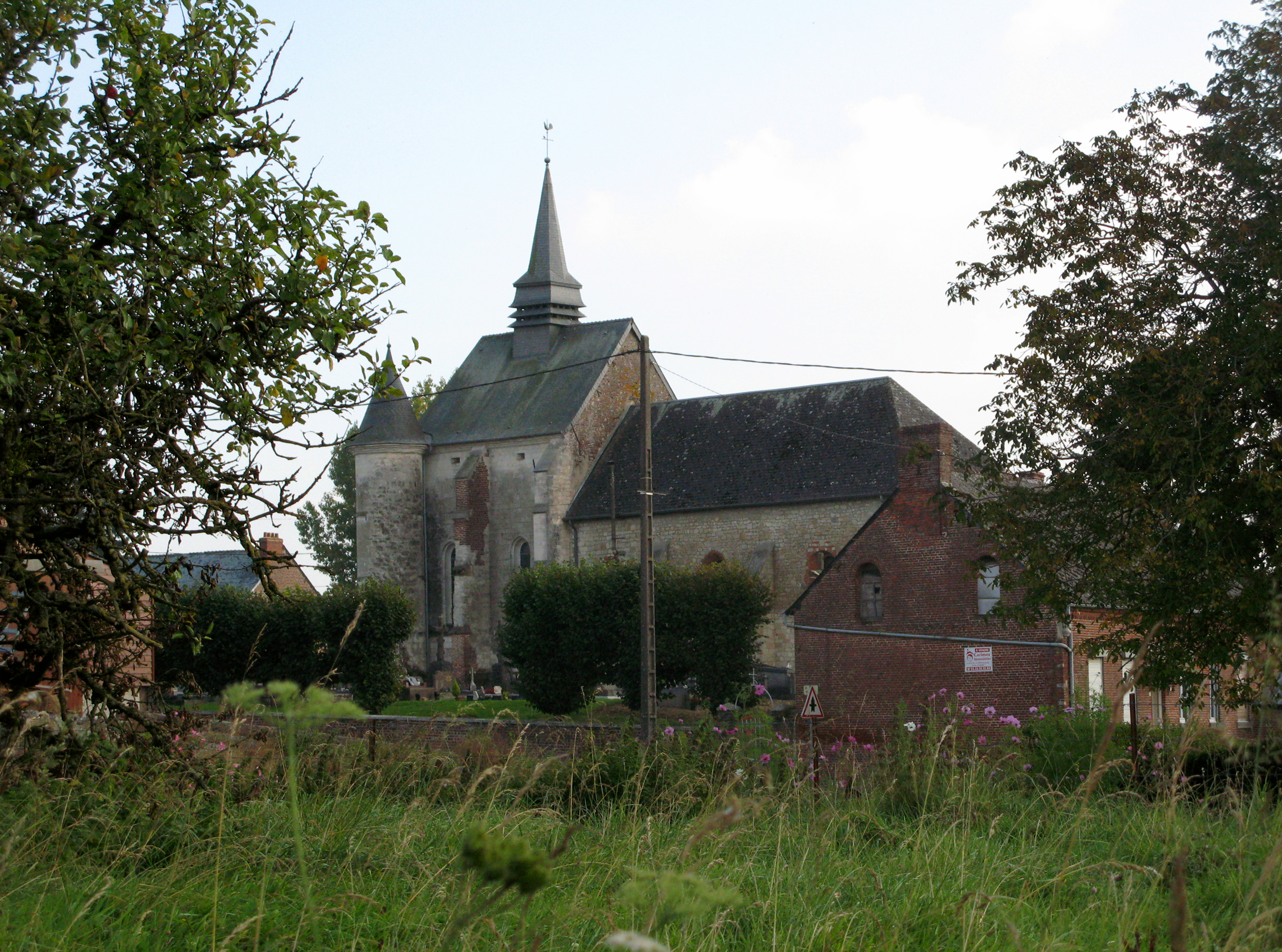
- The church of Renneval

- Coat of arms
- Location of Renneval
- Location within France Location within Hauts-de-France
- Coordinates: 49°44′28″N 4°02′58″E
- Country: France
- Region: Hauts-de-France
- Department: Aisne
- Arrondissement: Vervins
- Canton: Vervins
- Intercommunality: Portes de la Thiérache

Government
  - Mayor (2026–32): Hervé Van Coppenolle
- Area^{1}: 6.82 km^{2} (2.63 sq mi)
- Elevation: 200 m (660 ft)
- Highest elevation: 206 m (676 ft)
- Lowest elevation: 139 m (456 ft)
- Population (2023): 135
  - Density: 19.8/km^{2} (51.3/sq mi)
- Time zone: UTC+01:00 (CET)
  - Summer (DST): UTC+02:00 (CEST)
- INSEE/Postal code: 02641 /02340
- ^{1} French Land Register data, which excludes lakes, ponds, glaciers > 1 km^{2} (0.386 sq mi or 247 acres) and river estuaries.

Renneval (French pronunciation: [ʁɛnval]) is a commune in the Aisne department in Hauts-de-France in northern France.

== Population ==
Historical population
Year	Pop.	±% p.a.
1968	184	—
1975	181	−0.23%
1982	161	−1.66%
1990	163	+0.15%
1999	133	−2.23%
2007	131	−0.19%
2012	134	+0.45%
2017	113	−3.35%
2023	135	+3.01%
Source: INSEE

== See also ==
- Communes of the Aisne department
