= Burelles =

- Commune
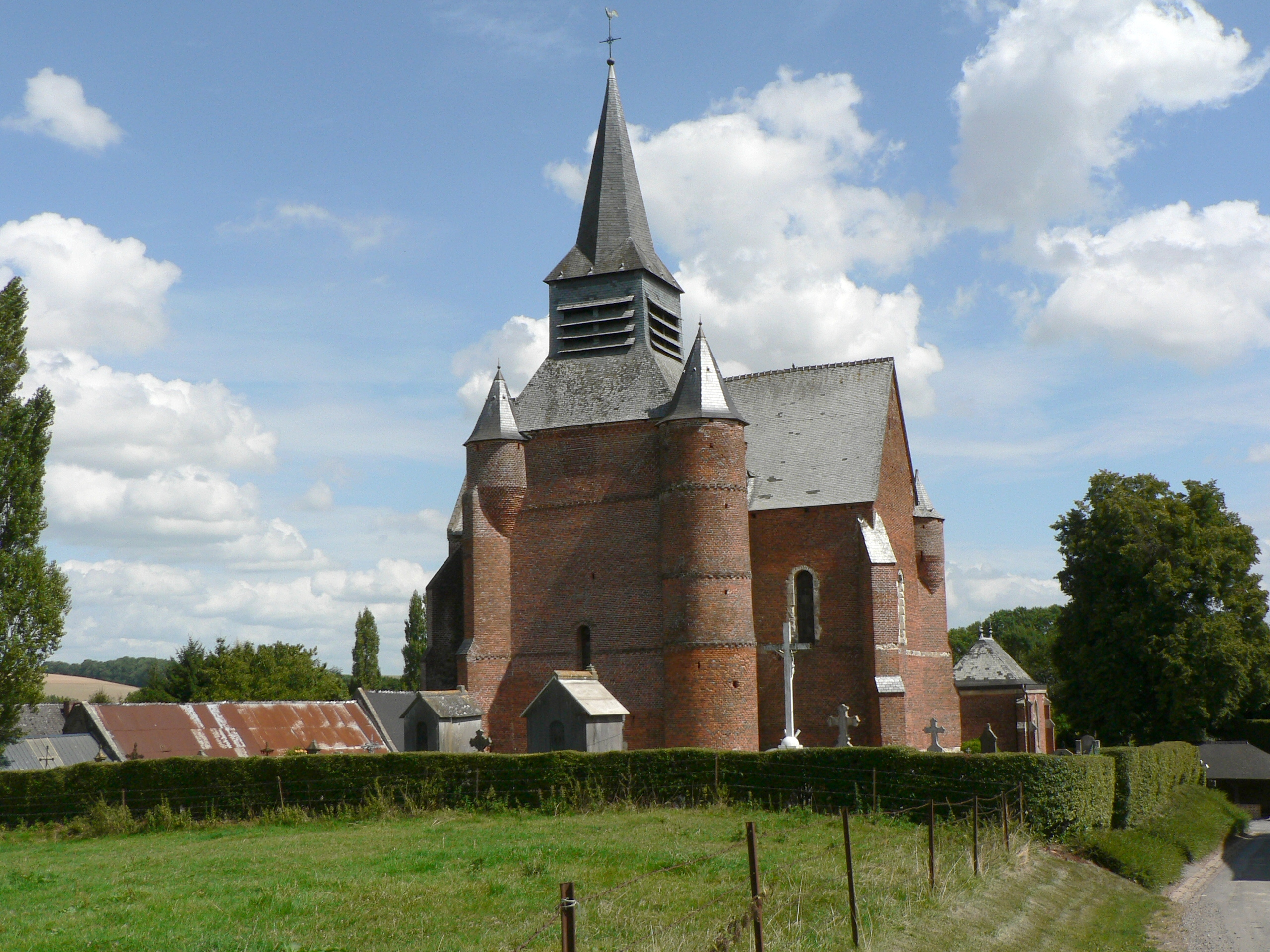
- The fortress church of Burelles
- Location of Burelles
- Location within France Location within Hauts-de-France
- Coordinates: 49°46′57″N 3°53′55″E
- Country: France
- Region: Hauts-de-France
- Department: Aisne
- Arrondissement: Vervins
- Canton: Vervins
- Intercommunality: Thiérache du Centre

Government
  - Mayor (2026–32): Damien Yverneau
- Area^{1}: 13.83 km^{2} (5.34 sq mi)
- Elevation: 120 m (390 ft)
- Highest elevation: 181 m (594 ft)
- Lowest elevation: 101 m (331 ft)
- Population (2023): 123
  - Density: 8.89/km^{2} (23.0/sq mi)
- Time zone: UTC+01:00 (CET)
  - Summer (DST): UTC+02:00 (CEST)
- INSEE/Postal code: 02136 /02140
- ^{1} French Land Register data, which excludes lakes, ponds, glaciers > 1 km^{2} (0.386 sq mi or 247 acres) and river estuaries.

Burelles (French pronunciation: [byʁɛl]) is a commune in the department of Aisne in Hauts-de-France in northern France.

== Population ==
Historical population
Year	Pop.	±% p.a.
1968	199	—
1975	175	−1.82%
1982	171	−0.33%
1990	182	+0.78%
1999	154	−1.84%
2007	147	−0.58%
2012	134	−1.83%
2017	128	−0.91%
2023	123	−0.66%
Source: INSEE

== See also ==
- Communes of the Aisne department
