= Noircourt =

- Commune
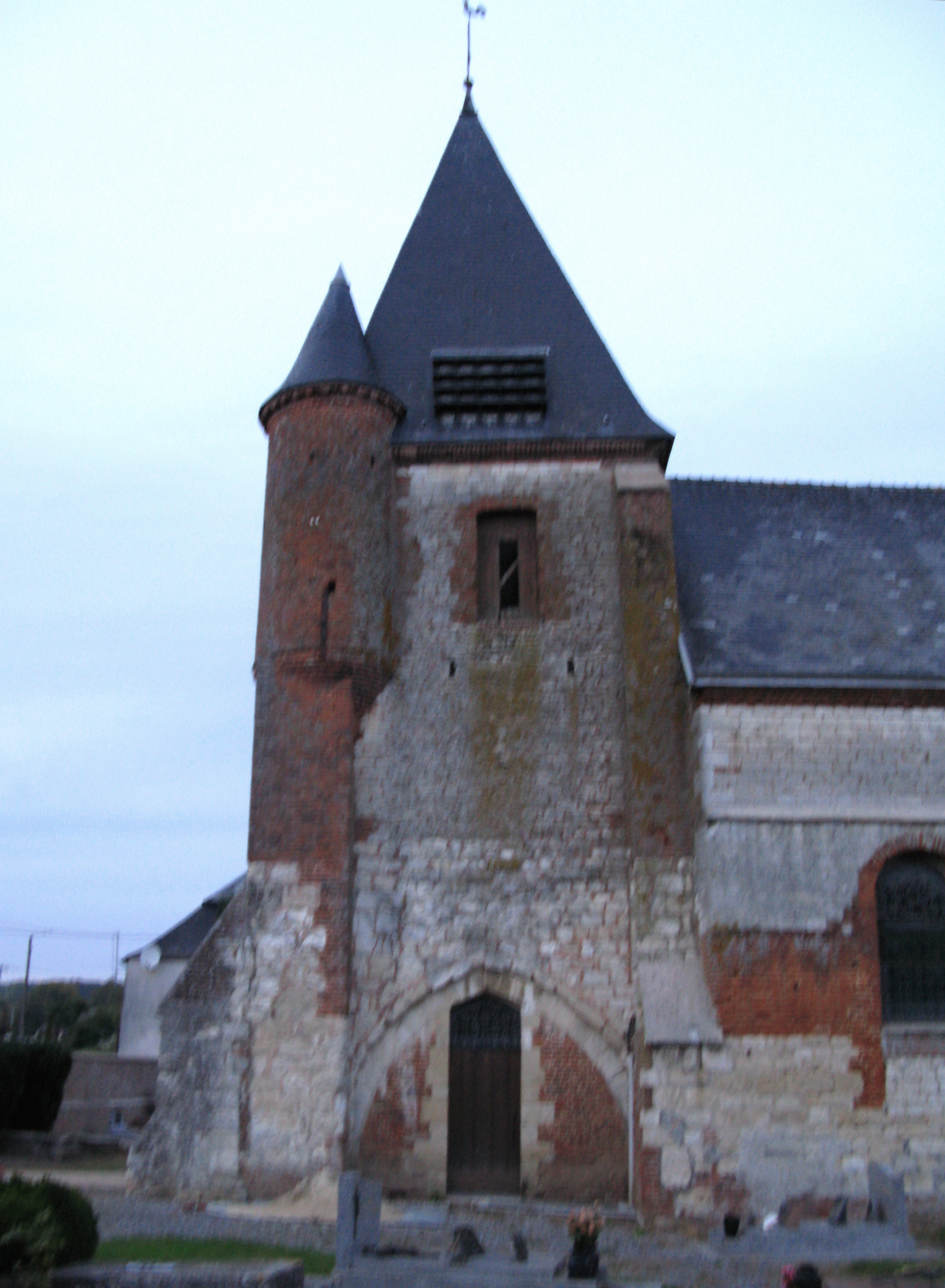
- The church of Noircourt
- Location of Noircourt
- Location within France Location within Hauts-de-France
- Coordinates: 49°40′07″N 4°05′35″E
- Country: France
- Region: Hauts-de-France
- Department: Aisne
- Arrondissement: Vervins
- Canton: Vervins
- Intercommunality: Portes de la Thiérache

Government
  - Mayor (2026–32): Thérèse Monarque
- Area^{1}: 5.45 km^{2} (2.10 sq mi)
- Elevation: 170 m (560 ft)
- Highest elevation: 191 m (627 ft)
- Lowest elevation: 122 m (400 ft)
- Population (2023): 68
  - Density: 12/km^{2} (32/sq mi)
- Time zone: UTC+01:00 (CET)
  - Summer (DST): UTC+02:00 (CEST)
- INSEE/Postal code: 02556 /02340
- ^{1} French Land Register data, which excludes lakes, ponds, glaciers > 1 km^{2} (0.386 sq mi or 247 acres) and river estuaries.

Noircourt (French pronunciation: [nwaʁkuʁ]) is a commune in the Aisne department in Hauts-de-France in northern France.

== Population ==
Historical population
Year	Pop.	±% p.a.
1968	152	—
1975	103	−5.41%
1982	109	+0.81%
1990	101	−0.95%
1999	92	−1.03%
2007	92	+0.00%
2012	85	−1.57%
2017	81	−0.96%
2023	68	−2.87%
Source: INSEE

== See also ==
- Communes of the Aisne department
