= Dagny-Lambercy =

- Commune
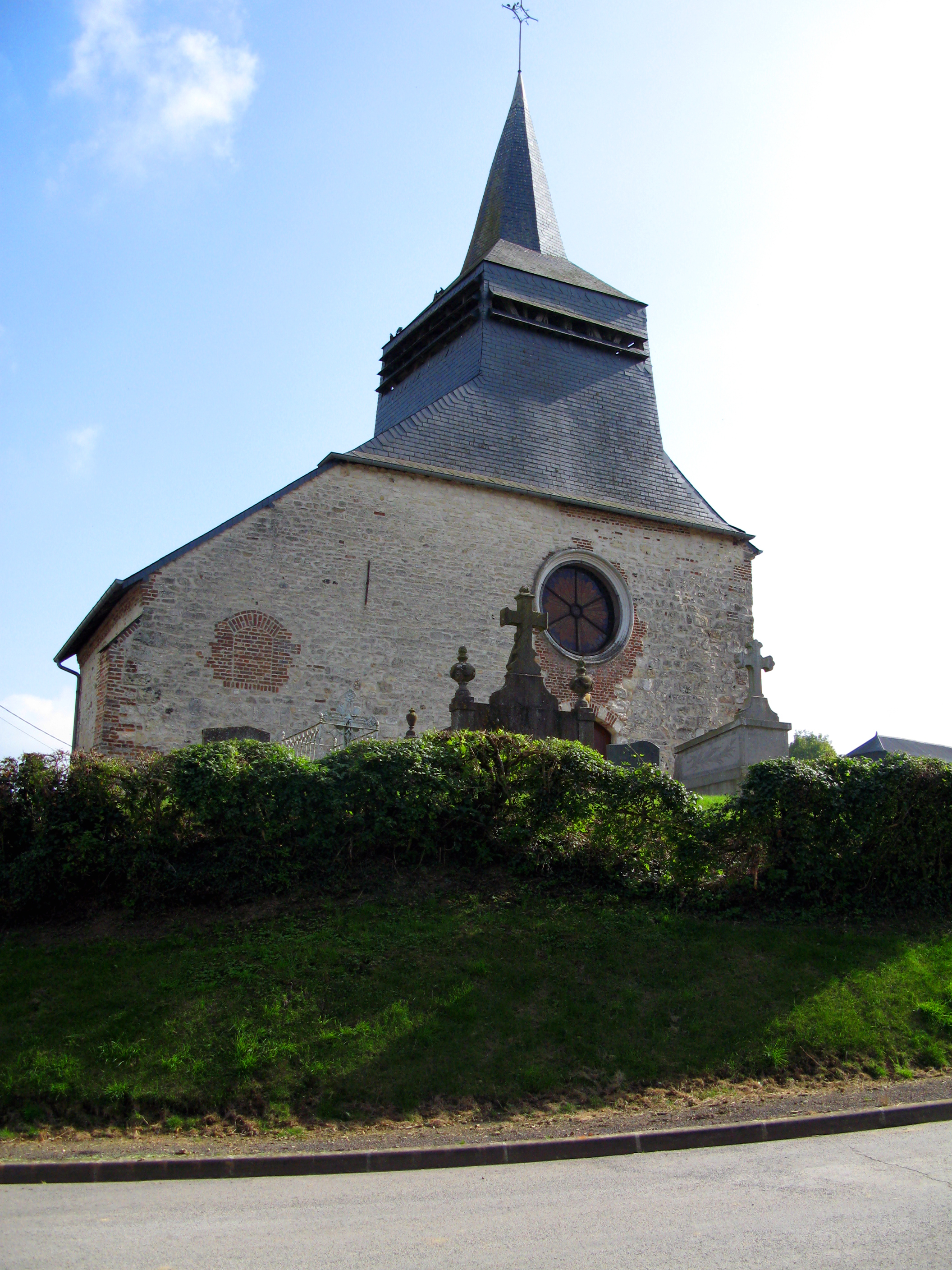
- The church of Dagny-Lambercy

- Coat of arms
- Location of Dagny-Lambercy
- Location within France Location within Hauts-de-France
- Coordinates: 49°46′17″N 4°02′40″E
- Country: France
- Region: Hauts-de-France
- Department: Aisne
- Arrondissement: Vervins
- Canton: Vervins
- Intercommunality: Portes de la Thiérache

Government
  - Mayor (2026–32): Pierre Didier
- Area^{1}: 10.04 km^{2} (3.88 sq mi)
- Elevation: 223 m (732 ft)
- Highest elevation: 211 m (692 ft)
- Lowest elevation: 137 m (449 ft)
- Population (2023): 123
  - Density: 12.3/km^{2} (31.7/sq mi)
- Time zone: UTC+01:00 (CET)
  - Summer (DST): UTC+02:00 (CEST)
- INSEE/Postal code: 02256 /02140
- ^{1} French Land Register data, which excludes lakes, ponds, glaciers > 1 km^{2} (0.386 sq mi or 247 acres) and river estuaries.

Dagny-Lambercy is a commune in the Aisne department in Hauts-de-France in northern France.

== Population ==
Historical population
Year	Pop.	±% p.a.
1968	212	—
1975	183	−2.08%
1982	169	−1.13%
1990	160	−0.68%
1999	159	−0.07%
2007	129	−2.58%
2012	138	+1.36%
2017	125	−1.96%
2023	123	−0.27%
Source: INSEE

== See also ==
- Communes of the Aisne department
