= Papleux =

- Commune
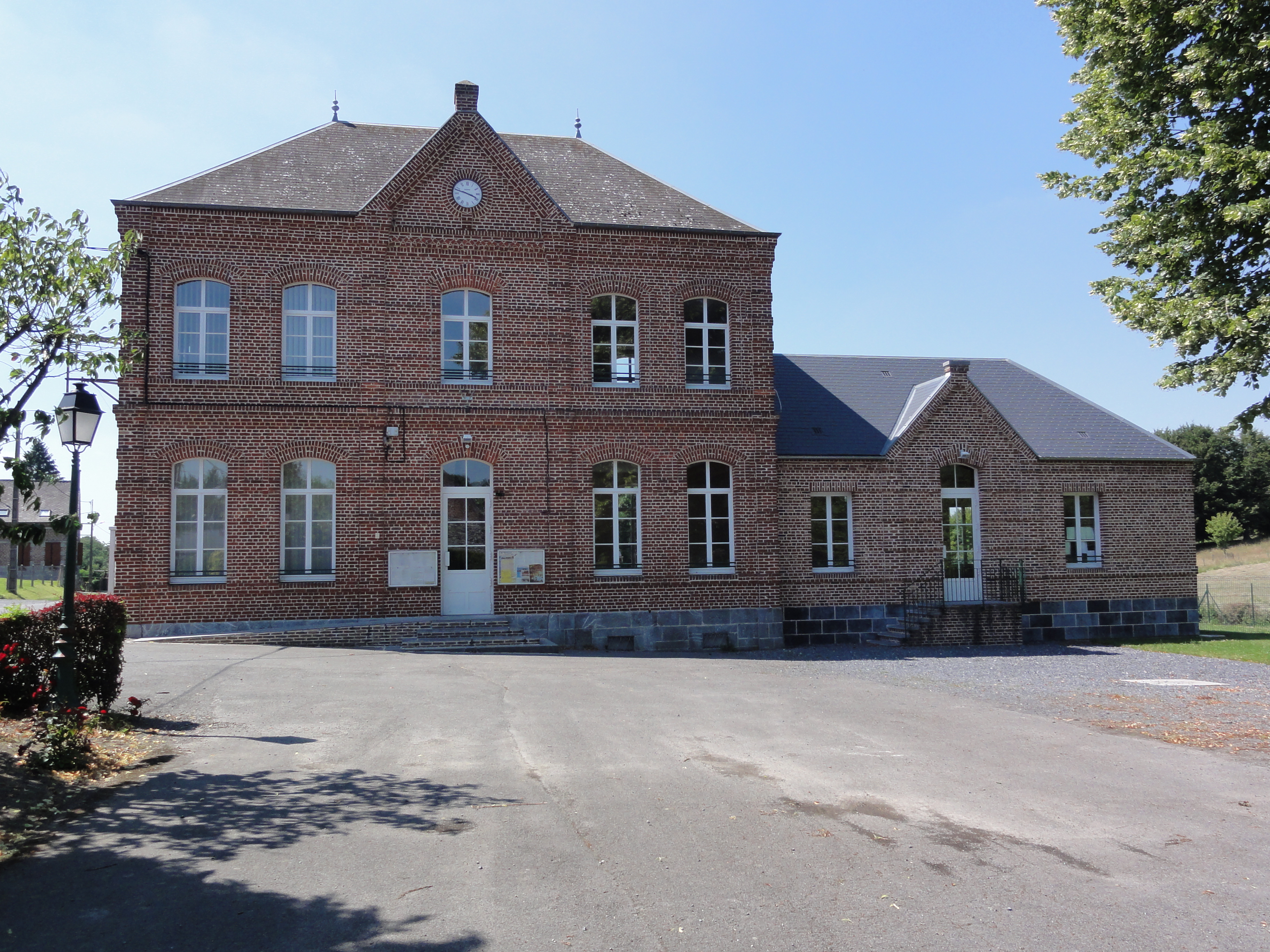
- The town hall of Papleux
- Location of Papleux
- Location within France Location within Hauts-de-France
- Coordinates: 50°01′18″N 3°53′09″E
- Country: France
- Region: Hauts-de-France
- Department: Aisne
- Arrondissement: Vervins
- Canton: Vervins
- Intercommunality: Thiérache du Centre

Government
  - Mayor (2026–32): Frédéric Meura
- Area^{1}: 1.93 km^{2} (0.75 sq mi)
- Elevation: 212 m (696 ft)
- Highest elevation: 228 m (748 ft)
- Lowest elevation: 189 m (620 ft)
- Population (2023): 114
  - Density: 59.1/km^{2} (153/sq mi)
- Time zone: UTC+01:00 (CET)
  - Summer (DST): UTC+02:00 (CEST)
- INSEE/Postal code: 02584 /02260
- ^{1} French Land Register data, which excludes lakes, ponds, glaciers > 1 km^{2} (0.386 sq mi or 247 acres) and river estuaries.

Papleux (French pronunciation: [paplø]) is a commune in the Aisne department in Hauts-de-France in northern France.

== Population ==
Historical population
Year	Pop.	±% p.a.
1968	104	—
1975	72	−5.12%
1982	91	+3.40%
1990	91	+0.00%
1999	118	+2.93%
2007	111	−0.76%
2012	108	−0.55%
2017	128	+3.46%
2023	114	−1.91%
Source: INSEE

== See also ==
- Communes of the Aisne department
