= Grandrieux =

- Commune
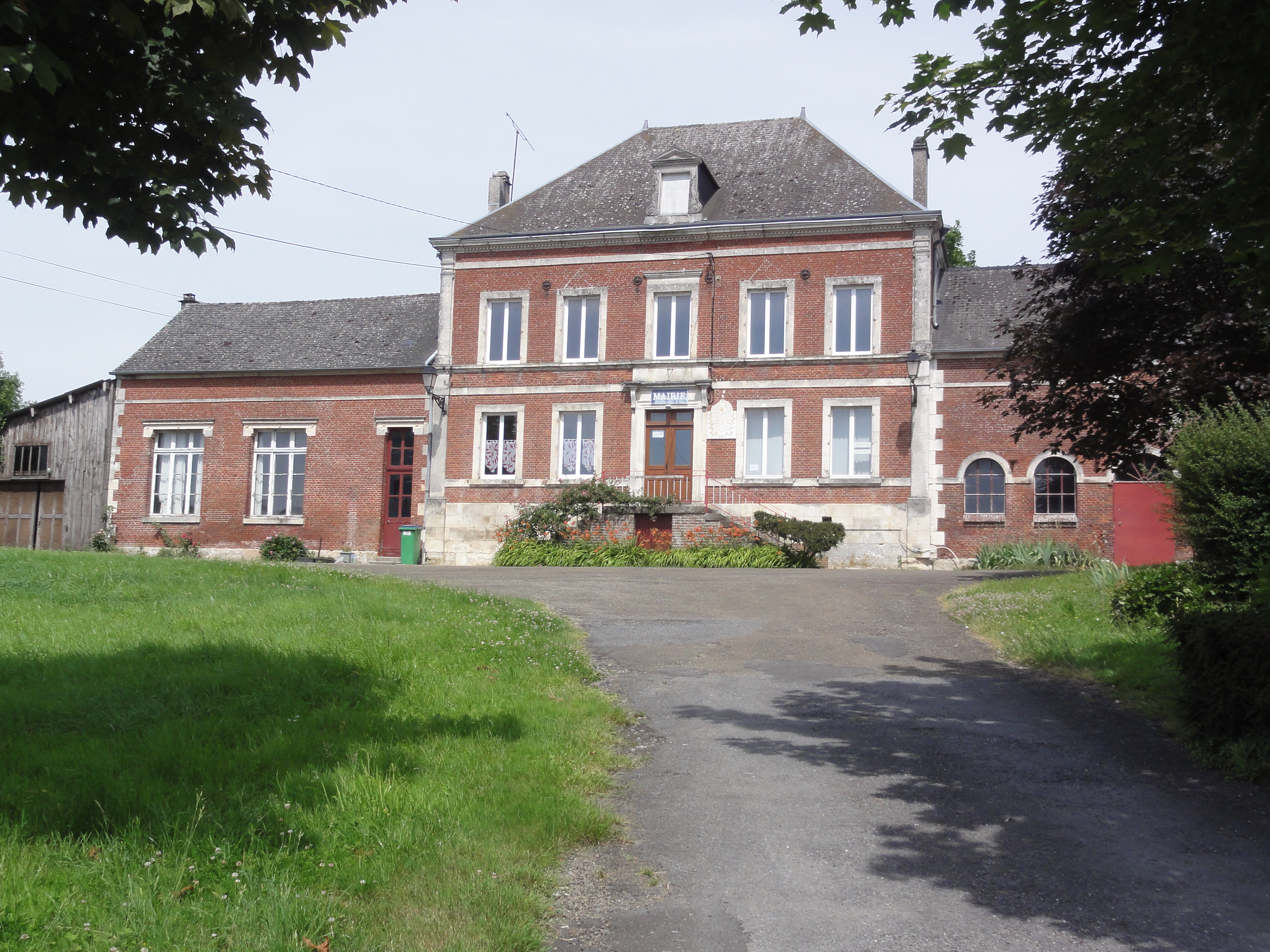
- The town hall of Grandrieux
- Location of Grandrieux
- Location within France Location within Hauts-de-France
- Coordinates: 49°43′52″N 4°11′08″E
- Country: France
- Region: Hauts-de-France
- Department: Aisne
- Arrondissement: Vervins
- Canton: Vervins
- Intercommunality: Portes de la Thiérache

Government
  - Mayor (2026–32): Vincent Nice
- Area^{1}: 4.35 km^{2} (1.68 sq mi)
- Elevation: 171 m (561 ft)
- Highest elevation: 242 m (794 ft)
- Lowest elevation: 147 m (482 ft)
- Population (2023): 80
  - Density: 18/km^{2} (48/sq mi)
- Time zone: UTC+01:00 (CET)
  - Summer (DST): UTC+02:00 (CEST)
- INSEE/Postal code: 02354 /02360
- ^{1} French Land Register data, which excludes lakes, ponds, glaciers > 1 km^{2} (0.386 sq mi or 247 acres) and river estuaries.

Grandrieux is a commune in the Aisne department in Hauts-de-France in northern France.

== Population ==
Historical population
Year	Pop.	±% p.a.
1968	137	—
1975	144	+0.71%
1982	121	−2.46%
1990	102	−2.11%
1999	97	−0.56%
2007	89	−1.07%
2012	90	+0.22%
2017	83	−1.61%
2023	80	−0.61%
Source: INSEE

== See also ==
- Communes of the Aisne department
