= Froidestrées =

- Commune
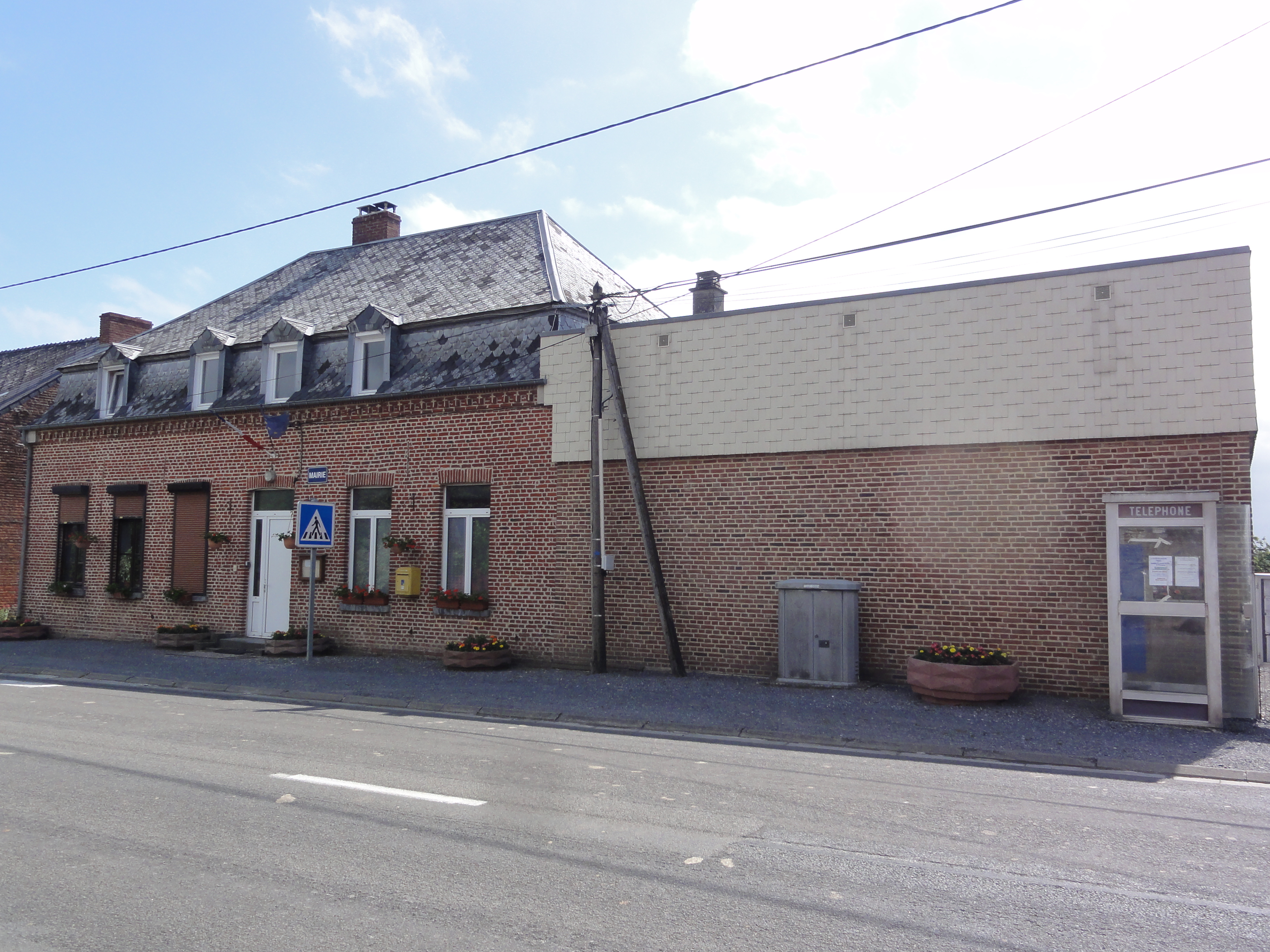
- The town hall of Froidestrées
- Location of Froidestrées
- Location within France Location within Hauts-de-France
- Coordinates: 49°56′30″N 3°54′24″E
- Country: France
- Region: Hauts-de-France
- Department: Aisne
- Arrondissement: Vervins
- Canton: Vervins
- Intercommunality: Thiérache du Centre

Government
  - Mayor (2020–2026): Pascal Dupont
- Area^{1}: 4.91 km^{2} (1.90 sq mi)
- Elevation: 204 m (669 ft)
- Highest elevation: 221 m (725 ft)
- Lowest elevation: 147 m (482 ft)
- Population (2023): 198
  - Density: 40.3/km^{2} (104/sq mi)
- Time zone: UTC+01:00 (CET)
  - Summer (DST): UTC+02:00 (CEST)
- INSEE/Postal code: 02337 /02260
- ^{1} French Land Register data, which excludes lakes, ponds, glaciers > 1 km^{2} (0.386 sq mi or 247 acres) and river estuaries.

Froidestrées is a commune in the Aisne department in Hauts-de-France in northern France.

== Population ==
Historical population
Year	Pop.	±% p.a.
1968	199	—
1975	174	−1.90%
1982	188	+1.11%
1990	199	+0.71%
1999	216	+0.91%
2007	206	−0.59%
2012	205	−0.10%
2017	176	−3.00%
2023	198	+1.98%
Source: INSEE

== See also ==
- Communes of the Aisne department
