= Lerzy =

- Commune
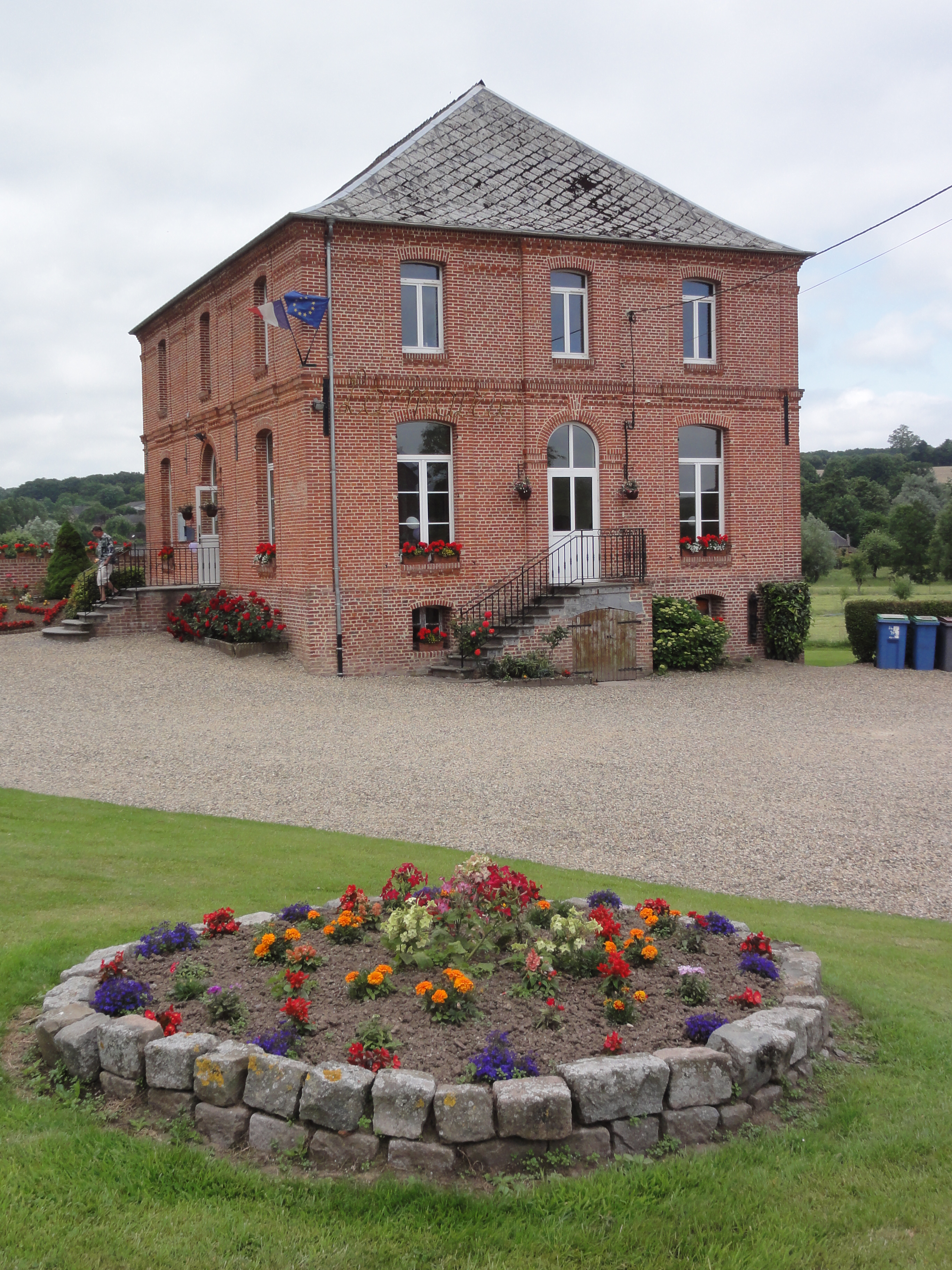
- The town hall of Lerzy
- Location of Lerzy
- Location within France Location within Hauts-de-France
- Coordinates: 49°56′46″N 3°53′20″E
- Country: France
- Region: Hauts-de-France
- Department: Aisne
- Arrondissement: Vervins
- Canton: Vervins
- Intercommunality: Thiérache du Centre

Government
  - Mayor (2026–32): Jérôme Langhendries
- Area^{1}: 11.54 km^{2} (4.46 sq mi)
- Elevation: 152 m (499 ft)
- Highest elevation: 219 m (719 ft)
- Lowest elevation: 140 m (460 ft)
- Population (2023): 223
  - Density: 19.3/km^{2} (50.0/sq mi)
- Time zone: UTC+01:00 (CET)
  - Summer (DST): UTC+02:00 (CEST)
- INSEE/Postal code: 02418 /02260
- ^{1} French Land Register data, which excludes lakes, ponds, glaciers > 1 km^{2} (0.386 sq mi or 247 acres) and river estuaries.

Lerzy (French pronunciation: [lɛʁzi]) is a commune in the Aisne department in Hauts-de-France in northern France.

== Population ==
Historical population
Year	Pop.	±% p.a.
1968	263	—
1975	257	−0.33%
1982	220	−2.20%
1990	209	−0.64%
1999	212	+0.16%
2007	194	−1.10%
2012	214	+1.98%
2017	213	−0.09%
2023	223	+0.77%
Source: INSEE

== See also ==
- Communes of the Aisne department
