= Gercy =

- Commune
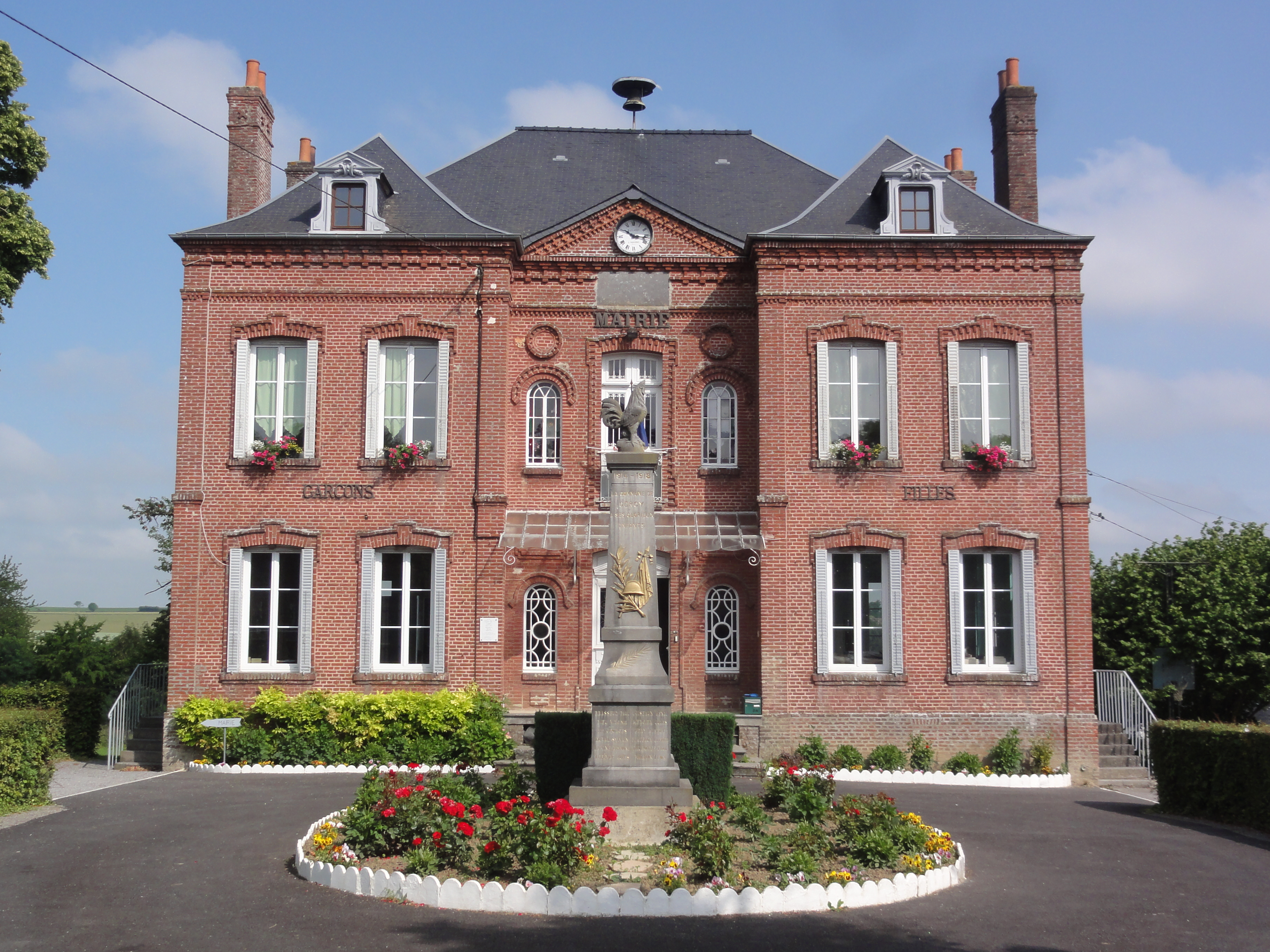
- The town hall of Gercy
- Location of Gercy
- Location within France Location within Hauts-de-France
- Coordinates: 49°48′50″N 3°52′06″E
- Country: France
- Region: Hauts-de-France
- Department: Aisne
- Arrondissement: Vervins
- Canton: Vervins
- Intercommunality: Thiérache du Centre

Government
  - Mayor (2026–32): Philippe Lemoine
- Area^{1}: 6.33 km^{2} (2.44 sq mi)
- Elevation: 130 m (430 ft)
- Highest elevation: 189 m (620 ft)
- Lowest elevation: 108 m (354 ft)
- Population (2023): 258
  - Density: 40.8/km^{2} (106/sq mi)
- Time zone: UTC+01:00 (CET)
  - Summer (DST): UTC+02:00 (CEST)
- INSEE/Postal code: 02341 /02140
- ^{1} French Land Register data, which excludes lakes, ponds, glaciers > 1 km^{2} (0.386 sq mi or 247 acres) and river estuaries.

Gercy (French pronunciation: [ʒɛʁsi]) is a commune in the Aisne department in Hauts-de-France in northern France.

== Population ==
Historical population
Year	Pop.	±% p.a.
1968	349	—
1975	314	−1.50%
1982	291	−1.08%
1990	332	+1.66%
1999	315	−0.58%
2007	302	−0.53%
2012	290	−0.81%
2017	277	−0.91%
2023	258	−1.18%
Source: INSEE

== See also ==
- Communes of the Aisne department
