= Canton of Vervins =

Coordinates: 49°50′N 3°54′E

Vervins
- Canton
- Interactive map of Vervins
- Country: France
- Region: Hauts-de-France
- Department: Aisne
- No. of communes: {{{nbcomm}}}
- Area: 641.09 km^{2} (247.53 sq mi)
- Population (2023): 20,771
  - Density: 32.400/km^{2} (83.914/sq mi)
- INSEE code: 02 19

The canton of Vervins is an administrative division in northern France. At the French canton reorganisation which came into effect in March 2015, the canton was expanded from 24 to 66 communes:

1. Archon
2. Les Autels
3. Autreppes
4. Bancigny
5. Berlise
6. La Bouteille
7. Braye-en-Thiérache
8. Brunehamel
9. Buironfosse
10. Burelles
11. La Capelle
12. Chaourse
13. Chéry-lès-Rozoy
14. Clairfontaine
15. Clermont-les-Fermes
16. Cuiry-lès-Iviers
17. Dagny-Lambercy
18. Dizy-le-Gros
19. Dohis
20. Dolignon
21. Englancourt
22. Erloy
23. Étréaupont
24. La Flamengrie
25. Fontaine-lès-Vervins
26. Fontenelle
27. Froidestrées
28. Gercy
29. Gergny
30. Grandrieux
31. Gronard
32. Harcigny
33. Hary
34. Haution
35. Houry
36. Laigny
37. Landouzy-la-Cour
38. Lerzy
39. Lislet
40. Luzoir
41. Montcornet
42. Montloué
43. Morgny-en-Thiérache
44. Nampcelles-la-Cour
45. Noircourt
46. Papleux
47. Parfondeval
48. Plomion
49. Prisces
50. Raillimont
51. Renneval
52. Résigny
53. Rocquigny
54. Rouvroy-sur-Serre
55. Rozoy-sur-Serre
56. Saint-Algis
57. Sainte-Geneviève
58. Soize
59. Sommeron
60. Sorbais
61. Thenailles
62. Le Thuel
63. Vervins
64. Vigneux-Hocquet
65. La Ville-aux-Bois-lès-Dizy
66. Vincy-Reuil-et-Magny

== Demographics ==
Historical population
Year	Pop.	±% p.a.
2013	22,215	—
2018	21,457	−0.69%
Source: INSEE

== See also ==
- Cantons of the Aisne department
- Communes of France
