= Gergny =

- Commune
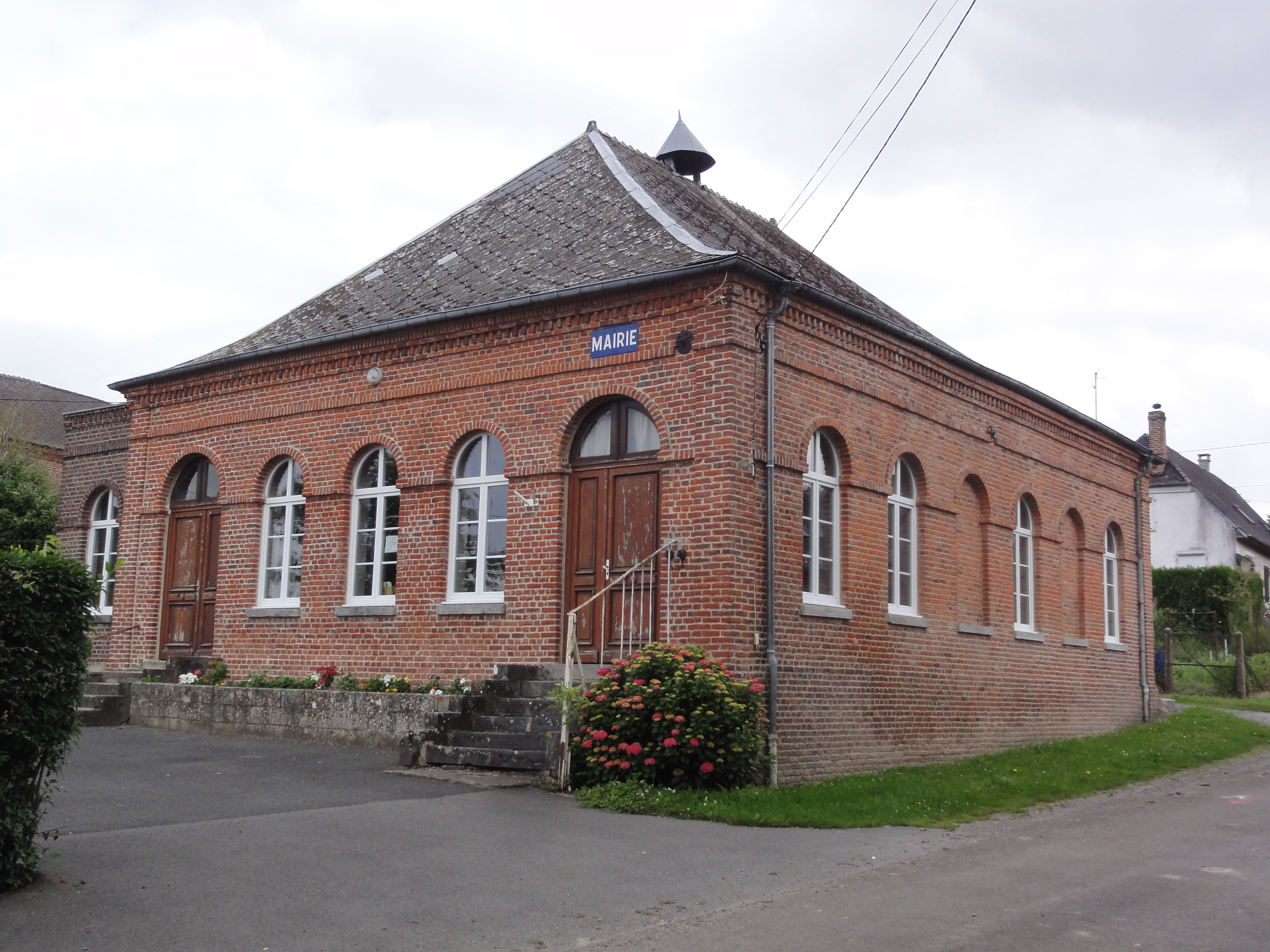
- The town hall of Gergny
- Location of Gergny
- Location within France Location within Hauts-de-France
- Coordinates: 49°54′54″N 3°56′06″E
- Country: France
- Region: Hauts-de-France
- Department: Aisne
- Arrondissement: Vervins
- Canton: Vervins
- Intercommunality: Thiérache du Centre

Government
  - Mayor (2026–32): Pascal Kuntzmann
- Area^{1}: 5.86 km^{2} (2.26 sq mi)
- Elevation: 200 m (660 ft)
- Highest elevation: 219 m (719 ft)
- Lowest elevation: 126 m (413 ft)
- Population (2023): 127
  - Density: 21.7/km^{2} (56.1/sq mi)
- Time zone: UTC+01:00 (CET)
  - Summer (DST): UTC+02:00 (CEST)
- INSEE/Postal code: 02342 /02260
- ^{1} French Land Register data, which excludes lakes, ponds, glaciers > 1 km^{2} (0.386 sq mi or 247 acres) and river estuaries.

Gergny (French pronunciation: [ʒɛʁɲi]) is a commune in the Aisne department in Hauts-de-France in northern France.

== Population ==
Historical population
Year	Pop.	±% p.a.
1968	197	—
1975	163	−2.67%
1982	156	−0.63%
1990	150	−0.49%
1999	151	+0.07%
2007	156	+0.41%
2012	146	−1.32%
2017	135	−1.55%
2023	127	−1.01%
Source: INSEE

== See also ==
- Communes of the Aisne department
