= Sorbais =

- Commune
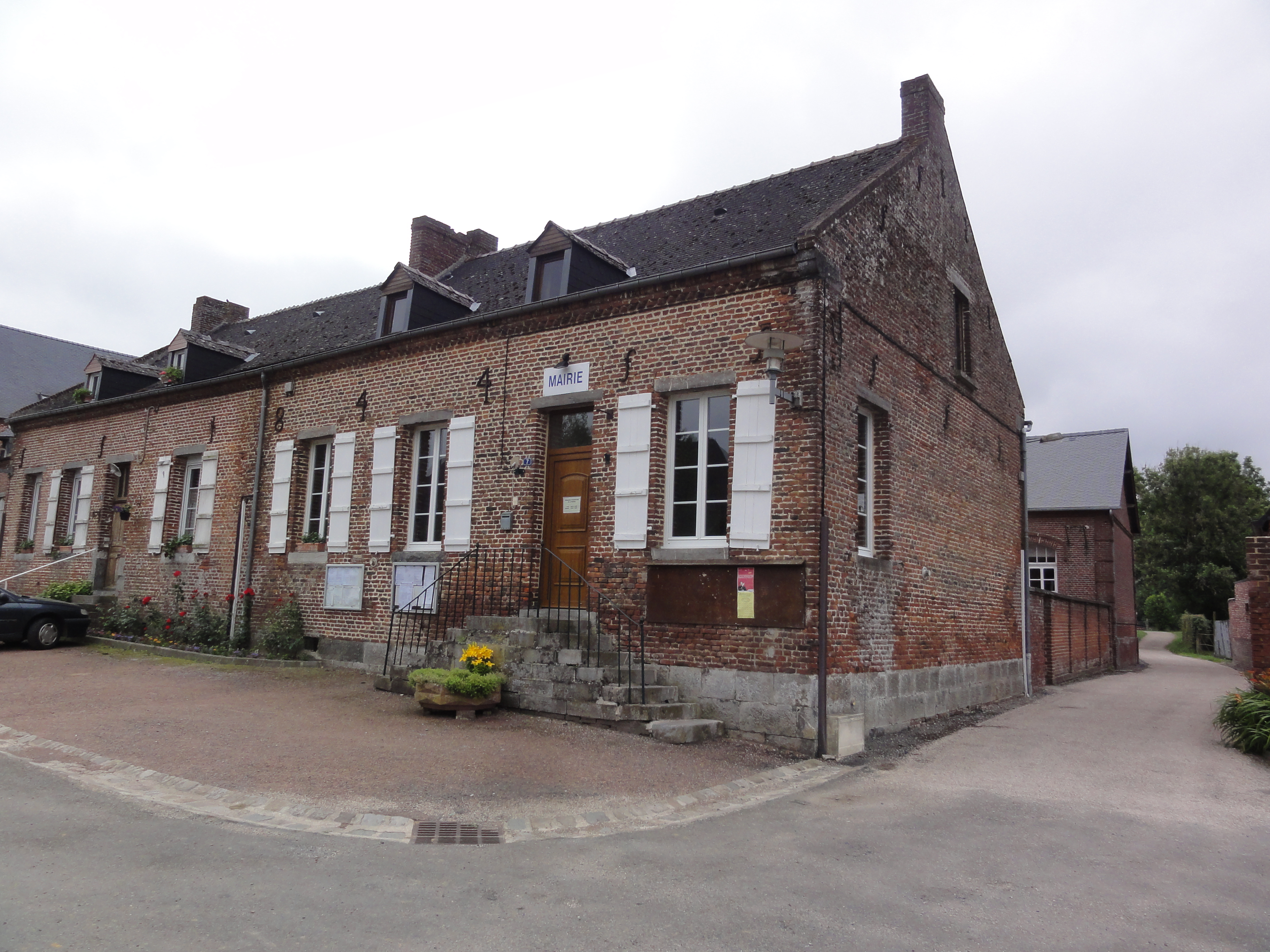
- The town hall of Sorbais
- Location of Sorbais
- Location within France Location within Hauts-de-France
- Coordinates: 49°54′30″N 3°53′41″E
- Country: France
- Region: Hauts-de-France
- Department: Aisne
- Arrondissement: Vervins
- Canton: Vervins
- Intercommunality: Thiérache du Centre

Government
  - Mayor (2026–32): Didier Gravet
- Area^{1}: 13.72 km^{2} (5.30 sq mi)
- Elevation: 181 m (594 ft)
- Highest elevation: 212 m (696 ft)
- Lowest elevation: 118 m (387 ft)
- Population (2023): 266
  - Density: 19.4/km^{2} (50.2/sq mi)
- Time zone: UTC+01:00 (CET)
  - Summer (DST): UTC+02:00 (CEST)
- INSEE/Postal code: 02728 /02580
- ^{1} French Land Register data, which excludes lakes, ponds, glaciers > 1 km^{2} (0.386 sq mi or 247 acres) and river estuaries.

Sorbais (French pronunciation: [sɔʁbɛ]) is a commune in the Aisne department in Hauts-de-France in northern France.

== Population ==
Historical population
Year	Pop.	±% p.a.
1968	412	—
1975	354	−2.14%
1982	337	−0.70%
1990	308	−1.12%
1999	286	−0.82%
2007	276	−0.44%
2012	285	+0.64%
2017	274	−0.78%
2023	266	−0.49%
Source: INSEE

== See also ==
- Communes of the Aisne department
