= Prisces =

- Commune
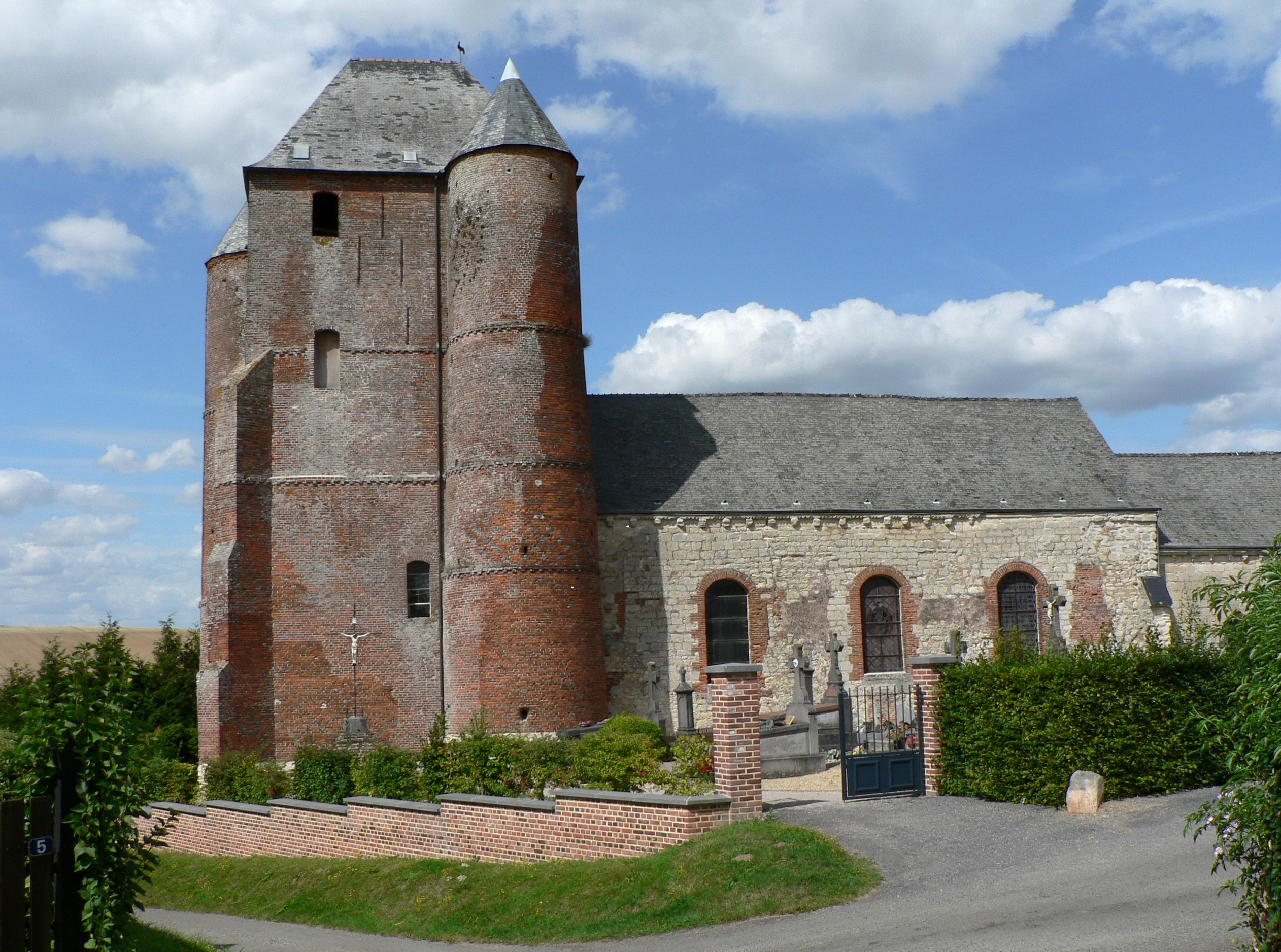
- The church of Prisces
- Location of Prisces
- Location within France Location within Hauts-de-France
- Coordinates: 49°46′47″N 3°51′46″E
- Country: France
- Region: Hauts-de-France
- Department: Aisne
- Arrondissement: Vervins
- Canton: Vervins
- Intercommunality: Thiérache du Centre

Government
  - Mayor (2026–32): Valérie Scarceriaux
- Area^{1}: 6.63 km^{2} (2.56 sq mi)
- Elevation: 120 m (390 ft)
- Highest elevation: 172 m (564 ft)
- Lowest elevation: 95 m (312 ft)
- Population (2023): 94
  - Density: 14/km^{2} (37/sq mi)
- Time zone: UTC+01:00 (CET)
  - Summer (DST): UTC+02:00 (CEST)
- INSEE/Postal code: 02623 /02140
- ^{1} French Land Register data, which excludes lakes, ponds, glaciers > 1 km^{2} (0.386 sq mi or 247 acres) and river estuaries.

Prisces (French pronunciation: [pʁis]) is a commune in the Aisne department in Hauts-de-France in northern France.

== Population ==
Historical population
Year	Pop.	±% p.a.
1968	163	—
1975	138	−2.35%
1982	149	+1.10%
1990	140	−0.78%
1999	105	−3.15%
2007	114	+1.03%
2012	111	−0.53%
2017	103	−1.48%
2023	94	−1.51%
Source: INSEE

== See also ==
- Communes of the Aisne department
