= Erloy =

Commune in Aisne, Hauts-de-France, France

- Commune
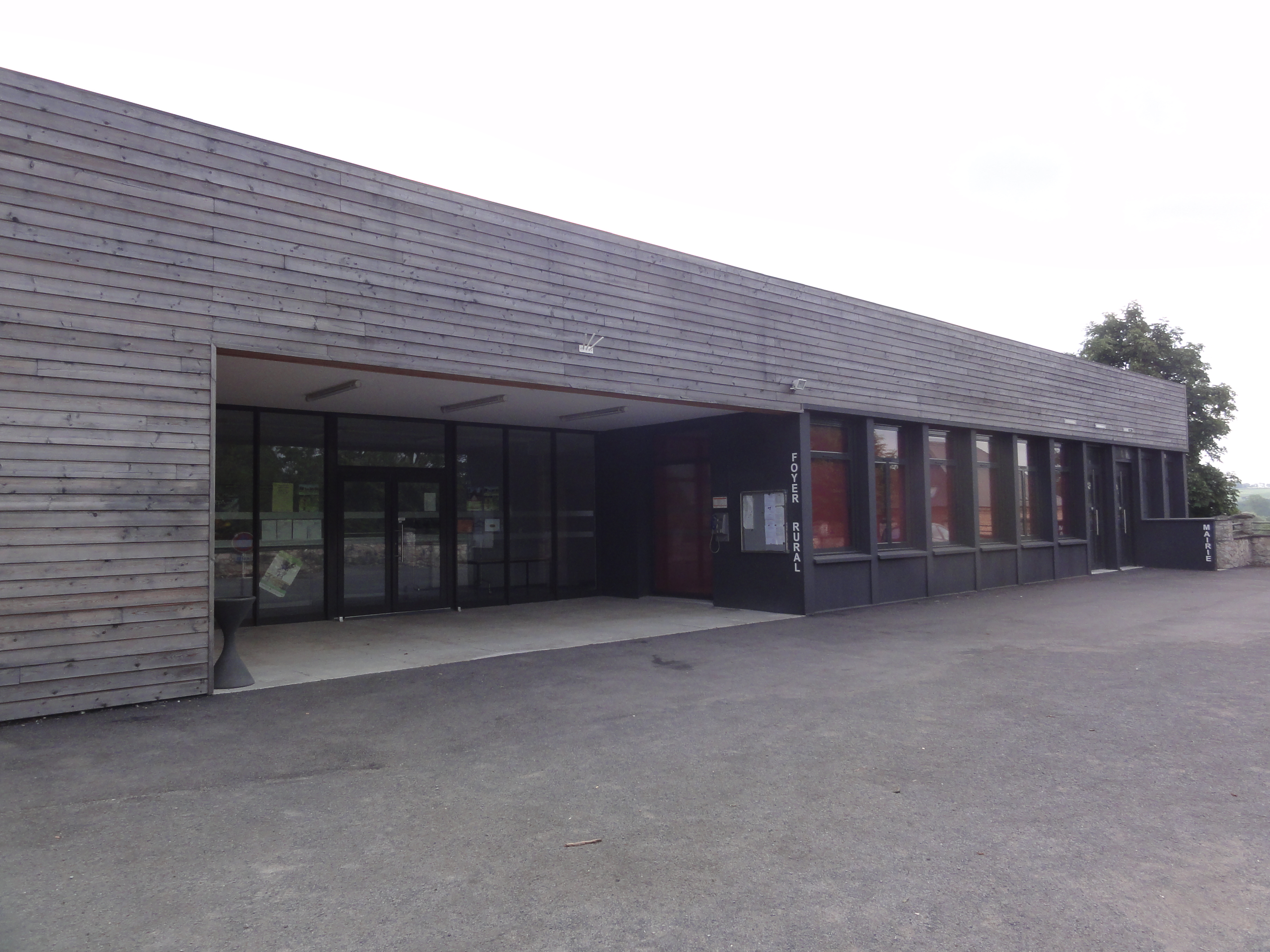
- The town hall of Erloy
- Location of Erloy
- Location within France Location within Hauts-de-France
- Coordinates: 49°54′51″N 3°49′50″E
- Country: France
- Region: Hauts-de-France
- Department: Aisne
- Arrondissement: Vervins
- Canton: Vervins
- Intercommunality: Thiérache du Centre

Government
  - Mayor (2026–32): Raymond Predhomme
- Area^{1}: 7.44 km^{2} (2.87 sq mi)
- Elevation: 121 m (397 ft)
- Highest elevation: 211 m (692 ft)
- Lowest elevation: 112 m (367 ft)
- Population (2023): 98
  - Density: 13/km^{2} (34/sq mi)
- Time zone: UTC+01:00 (CET)
  - Summer (DST): UTC+02:00 (CEST)
- INSEE/Postal code: 02284 /02260
- ^{1} French Land Register data, which excludes lakes, ponds, glaciers > 1 km^{2} (0.386 sq mi or 247 acres) and river estuaries.

Erloy (French pronunciation: [ɛʁlwa]) is a commune in the Aisne department in Hauts-de-France in northern France.

== Population ==
Historical population
Year	Pop.	±% p.a.
1968	176	—
1975	167	−0.75%
1982	135	−2.99%
1990	139	+0.37%
1999	123	−1.35%
2007	98	−2.80%
2012	90	−1.69%
2017	97	+1.51%
2023	98	+0.17%
Source: INSEE

== See also ==
- Communes of the Aisne department
