= Lislet =

- Commune
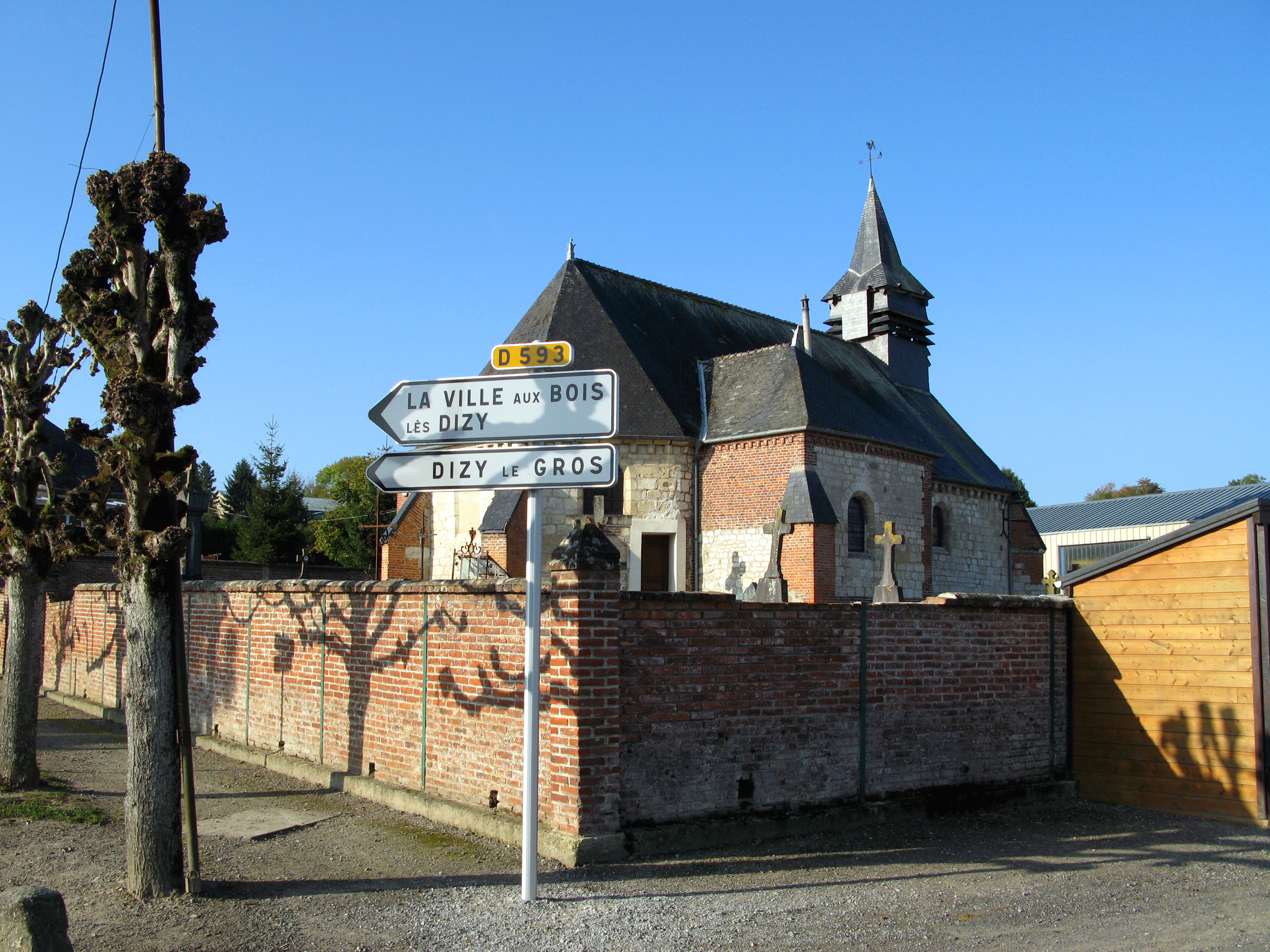
- The church of Lislet
- Location of Lislet
- Location within France Location within Hauts-de-France
- Coordinates: 49°41′14″N 4°01′19″E
- Country: France
- Region: Hauts-de-France
- Department: Aisne
- Arrondissement: Vervins
- Canton: Vervins
- Intercommunality: Portes de la Thiérache

Government
  - Mayor (2026–32): Jean-Michel Potard
- Area^{1}: 8.2 km^{2} (3.2 sq mi)
- Elevation: 117 m (384 ft)
- Highest elevation: 162 m (531 ft)
- Lowest elevation: 111 m (364 ft)
- Population (2023): 220
  - Density: 27/km^{2} (69/sq mi)
- Time zone: UTC+01:00 (CET)
  - Summer (DST): UTC+02:00 (CEST)
- INSEE/Postal code: 02433 /02340
- ^{1} French Land Register data, which excludes lakes, ponds, glaciers > 1 km^{2} (0.386 sq mi or 247 acres) and river estuaries.

Lislet is a commune in the Aisne department in Hauts-de-France in northern France.

== Population ==
Historical population
Year	Pop.	±% p.a.
1968	212	—
1975	206	−0.41%
1982	237	+2.02%
1990	242	+0.26%
1999	232	−0.47%
2007	247	+0.79%
2012	245	−0.16%
2017	225	−1.69%
2023	220	−0.37%
Source: INSEE

== See also ==
- Communes of the Aisne department
