= Luzoir =

- Commune
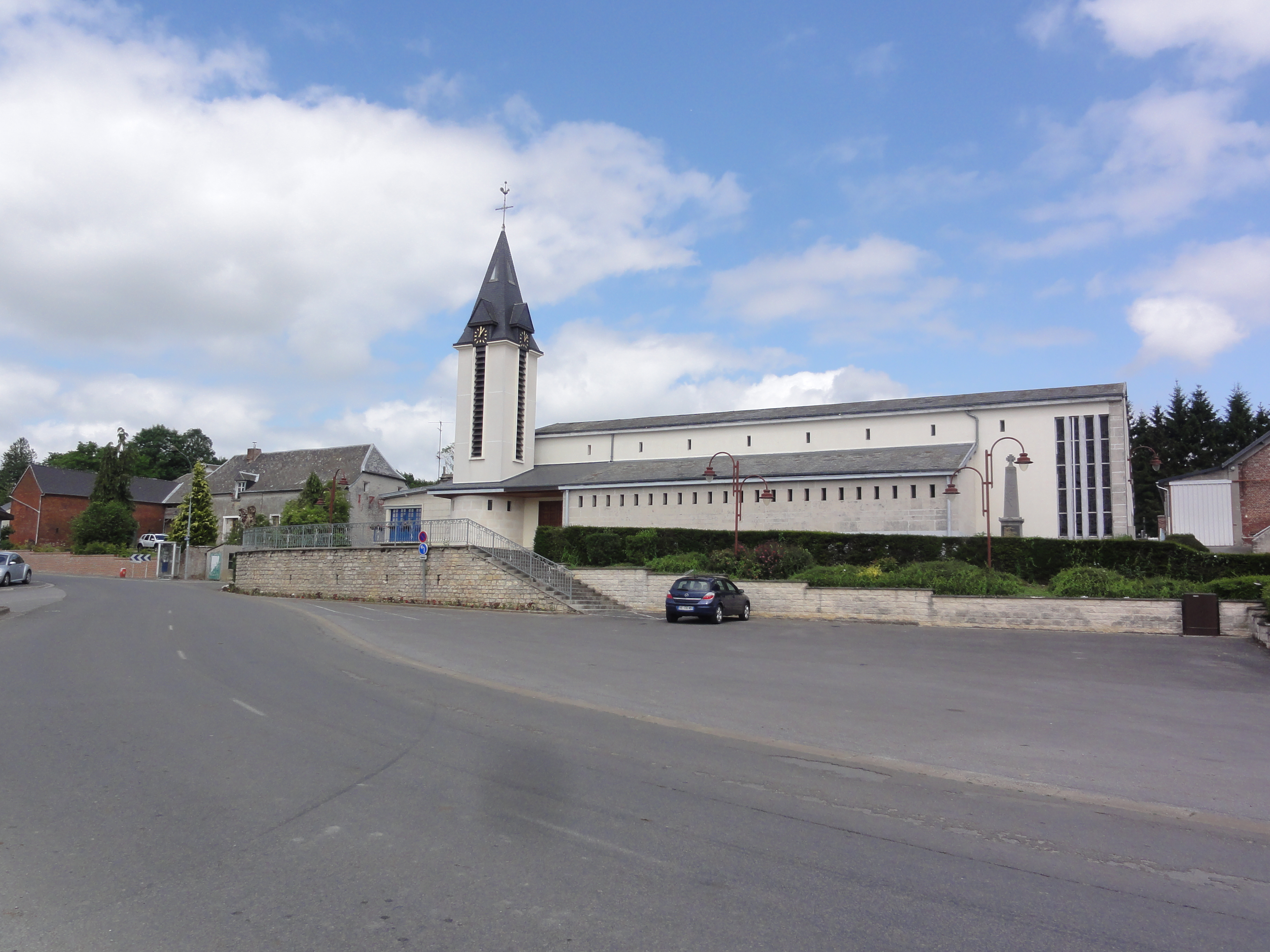
- The church of Luzoir
- Location of Luzoir
- Location within France Location within Hauts-de-France
- Coordinates: 49°55′34″N 3°57′46″E
- Country: France
- Region: Hauts-de-France
- Department: Aisne
- Arrondissement: Vervins
- Canton: Vervins
- Intercommunality: Thiérache du Centre

Government
  - Mayor (2026–32): Jérémy Choulette
- Area^{1}: 10.99 km^{2} (4.24 sq mi)
- Elevation: 68 m (223 ft)
- Highest elevation: 221 m (725 ft)
- Lowest elevation: 128 m (420 ft)
- Population (2023): 266
  - Density: 24.2/km^{2} (62.7/sq mi)
- Time zone: UTC+01:00 (CET)
  - Summer (DST): UTC+02:00 (CEST)
- INSEE/Postal code: 02445 /02500
- ^{1} French Land Register data, which excludes lakes, ponds, glaciers > 1 km^{2} (0.386 sq mi or 247 acres) and river estuaries.

Luzoir (French pronunciation: [lyzwaʁ]) is a commune in the Aisne department in Hauts-de-France in northern France.

== Population ==
Historical population
Year	Pop.	±% p.a.
1968	381	—
1975	348	−1.29%
1982	328	−0.84%
1990	301	−1.07%
1999	279	−0.84%
2007	287	+0.35%
2012	295	+0.55%
2017	285	−0.69%
2023	266	−1.14%
Source: INSEE

== See also ==
- Communes of the Aisne department
