= Canton of Le Nouvion-en-Thiérache =

Coordinates: 50°01′N 3°46′E

Le Nouvion-en-Thiérache
- Former canton
- Interactive map of Le Nouvion-en-Thiérache
- Country: France
- Region: Hauts-de-France
- Department: Aisne
- No. of communes: {{{nbcomm}}}
- Disbanded: 2015
- Area: 192.33 km^{2} (74.26 sq mi)
- Population (2012): 6,805
  - Density: 35.38/km^{2} (91.64/sq mi)

The canton of Le Nouvion-en-Thiérache is an administrative division in northern France. It was disbanded following the French canton reorganisation which came into effect in March 2015. It consisted of 9 communes, which joined the canton of Guise in 2015. It had 6,805 inhabitants (2012).

The canton comprised the following communes:

- Barzy-en-Thiérache
- Bergues-sur-Sambre
- Boué
- Dorengt
- Esquéhéries
- Fesmy-le-Sart
- Leschelle
- La Neuville-lès-Dorengt
- Le Nouvion-en-Thiérache

== Demographics ==
Historical population Canton of Le Nouvion-en-Thiérache
Year	1962	1968	1975	1982	1990	1999
Pop.	7,512	8,089	7,875	7,584	7,118	6,814
±%	—	+7.7%	−2.6%	−3.7%	−6.1%	−4.3%
From the year 1962 on: No double counting – residents of multiple communes (e.g. students and military personnel) are counted only once. Source: INSEE

== See also ==
- Cantons of the Aisne department
