= Verly =

Verly may refer to:

== People ==
- Albert Jacques Verly, French military officer
- Michèle Verly (1909–1952), French stage and film actress

== Places ==
- Verly (former commune), France
  - Grand-Verly, France
  - Petit-Verly, France
