= Romery =

Romery may refer to the following places in France:

- Romery, Aisne, a commune in the department of Aisne
- Romery, Marne, a commune in the department of Marne
