= Chigny =

Chigny may refer to:

- Chigny, Aisne, a commune in France
- Chigny, Switzerland, a municipality in the canton of Vaud

== See also ==
- Chigny-les-Roses, in the Marne department, France
