= Noyales =

- Commune
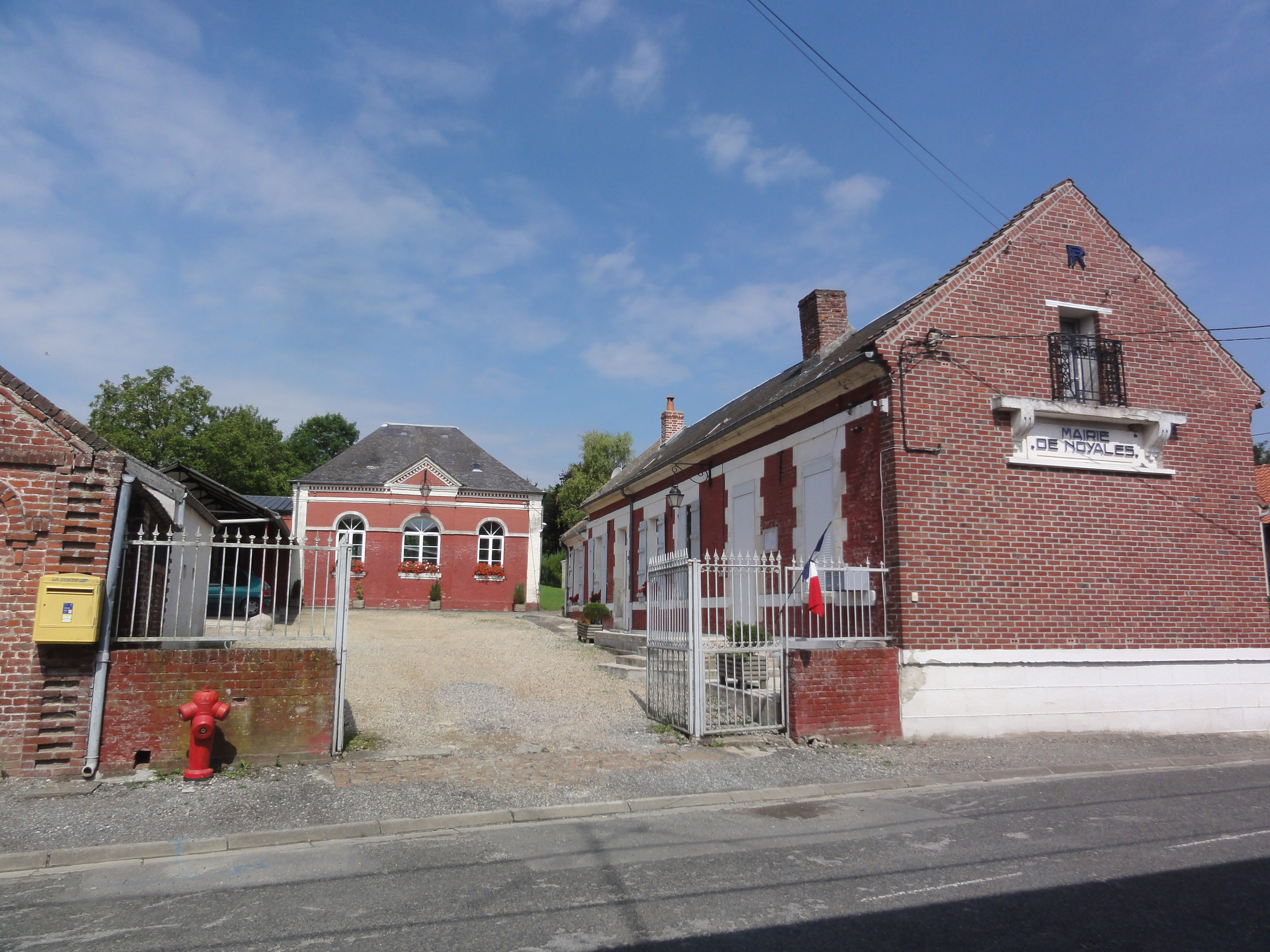
- The town hall of Noyales
- Location of Noyales
- Location within France Location within Hauts-de-France
- Coordinates: 49°53′57″N 3°33′19″E
- Country: France
- Region: Hauts-de-France
- Department: Aisne
- Arrondissement: Vervins
- Canton: Guise

Government
  - Mayor (2026–32): Joël Wateau
- Area^{1}: 7.18 km^{2} (2.77 sq mi)
- Elevation: 84 m (276 ft)
- Highest elevation: 151 m (495 ft)
- Lowest elevation: 80 m (260 ft)
- Population (2023): 132
  - Density: 18.4/km^{2} (47.6/sq mi)
- Time zone: UTC+01:00 (CET)
  - Summer (DST): UTC+02:00 (CEST)
- INSEE/Postal code: 02563 /02120
- ^{1} French Land Register data, which excludes lakes, ponds, glaciers > 1 km^{2} (0.386 sq mi or 247 acres) and river estuaries.

Noyales (French pronunciation: [nwajal]) is a commune in the Aisne department in Hauts-de-France, France.

== Population ==
Historical population
| Year | Pop. | ±% p.a. |
|---|---|---|
| 1968 | 185 | — |
| 1975 | 176 | −0.71% |
| 1982 | 161 | −1.26% |
| 1990 | 153 | −0.64% |
| 1999 | 141 | −0.90% |
| 2007 | 164 | +1.91% |
| 2012 | 171 | +0.84% |
| 2017 | 167 | −0.47% |
| 2023 | 132 | −3.84% |
Source: INSEE

== See also ==
- Communes of the Aisne department
