= Macquigny =

- Commune
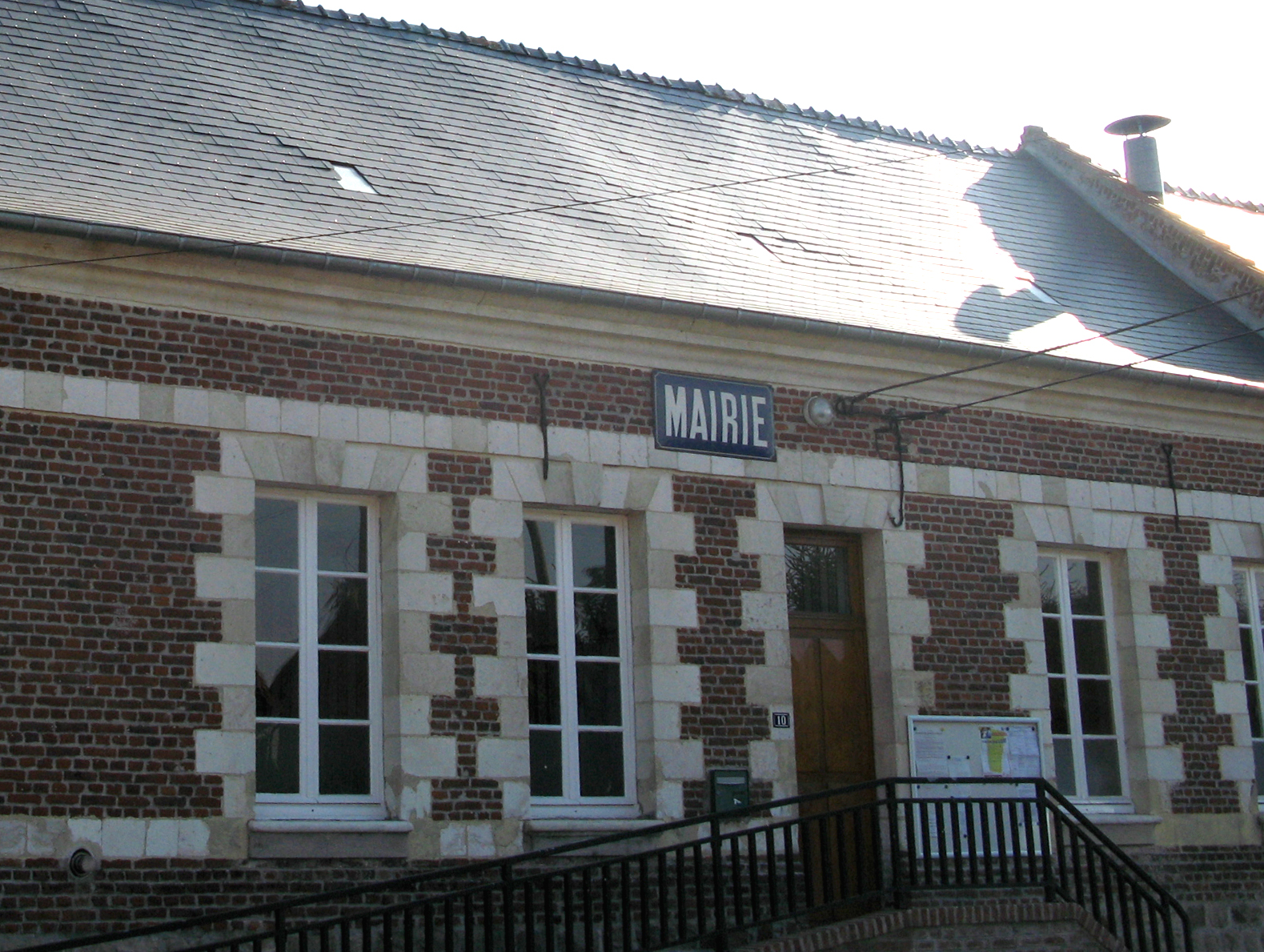
- Town hall

- Coat of arms
- Location of Macquigny
- Location within France Location within Hauts-de-France
- Coordinates: 49°53′09″N 3°33′09″E
- Country: France
- Region: Hauts-de-France
- Department: Aisne
- Arrondissement: Vervins
- Canton: Guise

Government
  - Mayor (2026–32): Marc Ratte
- Area^{1}: 20.18 km^{2} (7.79 sq mi)
- Elevation: 83 m (272 ft)
- Highest elevation: 153 m (502 ft)
- Lowest elevation: 77 m (253 ft)
- Population (2023): 357
  - Density: 17.7/km^{2} (45.8/sq mi)
- Time zone: UTC+01:00 (CET)
  - Summer (DST): UTC+02:00 (CEST)
- INSEE/Postal code: 02450 /02120
- ^{1} French Land Register data, which excludes lakes, ponds, glaciers > 1 km^{2} (0.386 sq mi or 247 acres) and river estuaries.

Macquigny (French pronunciation: [makiɲi]) is a commune in the Aisne department in Hauts-de-France in northern France.

== Population ==
Historical population
Year	Pop.	±% p.a.
1968	515	—
1975	419	−2.90%
1982	393	−0.91%
1990	346	−1.58%
1999	362	+0.50%
2007	395	+1.10%
2012	375	−1.03%
2017	376	+0.05%
2023	357	−0.86%
Source: INSEE

== See also ==
- Communes of the Aisne department
