= Iron, Aisne =

Iron
- Commune
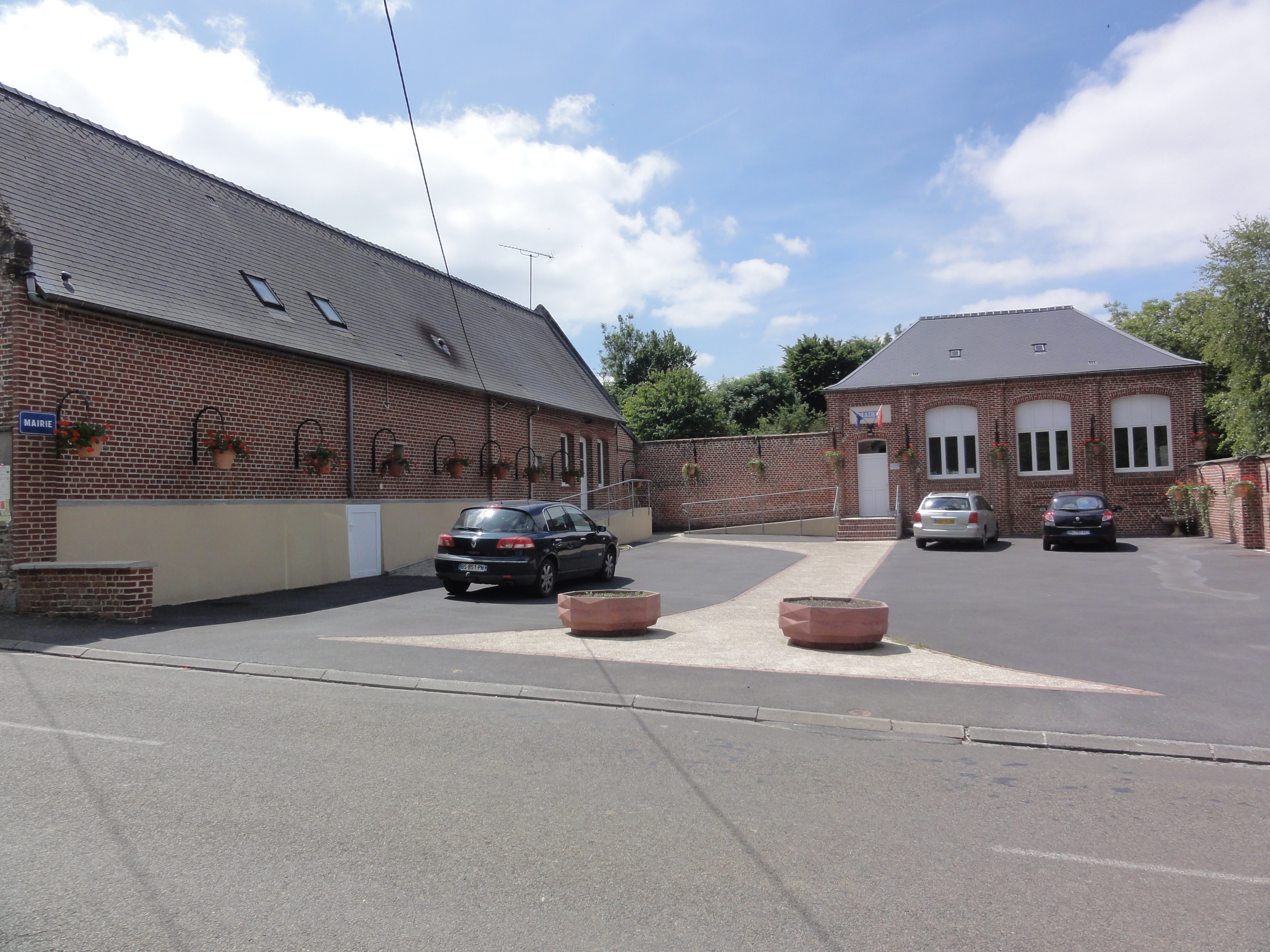
- The town hall of Iron
- Location of Iron
- Location within France Location within Hauts-de-France
- Coordinates: 49°57′18″N 3°39′39″E
- Country: France
- Region: Hauts-de-France
- Department: Aisne
- Arrondissement: Vervins
- Canton: Guise
- Intercommunality: Thiérache Sambre et Oise

Government
  - Mayor (2026–32): Marilyne Bacquet
- Area^{1}: 9.51 km^{2} (3.67 sq mi)
- Elevation: 145 m (476 ft)
- Highest elevation: 160 m (520 ft)
- Lowest elevation: 110 m (360 ft)
- Population (2023): 224
  - Density: 23.6/km^{2} (61.0/sq mi)
- Time zone: UTC+01:00 (CET)
  - Summer (DST): UTC+02:00 (CEST)
- INSEE/Postal code: 02386 /02510
- ^{1} French Land Register data, which excludes lakes, ponds, glaciers > 1 km^{2} (0.386 sq mi or 247 acres) and river estuaries.

Iron (French pronunciation: [iʁɔ̃]) is a commune in the Aisne department in Hauts-de-France in northern France.

== Population ==
Historical population
Year	Pop.	±% p.a.
1968	300	—
1975	276	−1.18%
1982	287	+0.56%
1990	284	−0.13%
1999	225	−2.55%
2007	224	−0.06%
2012	228	+0.35%
2017	239	+0.95%
2023	224	−1.07%
Source: INSEE

== The Iron 12 ==
On 25 February 1915 during the First World War there was a massacre of British soldiers in Iron. The soldiers' regiment had gotten cut off from the rest of the army, causing the regiment to split up and wait until the other British regiments came back. A French civilian named Vincente Chalandre and his family let eleven soldiers shelter in their attic, and the mill owner let them stay in the town's mill. A neighbour tipped them off to nearby German soldiers. The mill owner's daughter saw forty German soldiers entering the town and warned the soldiers they needed to leave. The soldiers hid outside the mill and thus were not captured.

Clovis, Chalandre's son, was having an affair at the time with the 22-year-old woman named Blanche Griselin, whose husband, a member of the French military, was not in Iron at the time. Griselin was actually holding a double affair involved with her husband Clovis, and a Franco-Prussian War veteran named Louis Bachelet. Bachelet became aware of Clovis and how the Chalandre family was hiding British soldiers in their attic. He tipped off the German military, which arrested all eleven soldiers and Vincente Chalandre. The Germans burned the mill owner's mill to the ground to punish the mill owner for helping Chalandre, and Chalendre's daughter was ordered to burn down their family home. On 25 February Chalandre and the eleven soldiers were forced to dig their own graves, and they were shot by firing squad. Three riflemen were sent to kill each soldier, two of which aimed for the heart and the third for the legs. Of the eleven soldiers who died, five were English and the other six Irishmen. The remaining members of the Chalandre family were rounded up and sent to jail in Germany, except for the three youngest children, who were forced to live homeless by themselves, where they grew weak and neglected. When the war ended Mrs. Chalandre came back to Iron, weak and very sick with Tuberculous meningitis. Her three young children caught the disease from her and all four died in 1919, too weak to survive. Clovis, struck by grief, turned to alcoholism, which eventually killed him in 1948, when he was 50 years old.

== See also ==
- Communes of the Aisne department
