= Proix =

- Commune
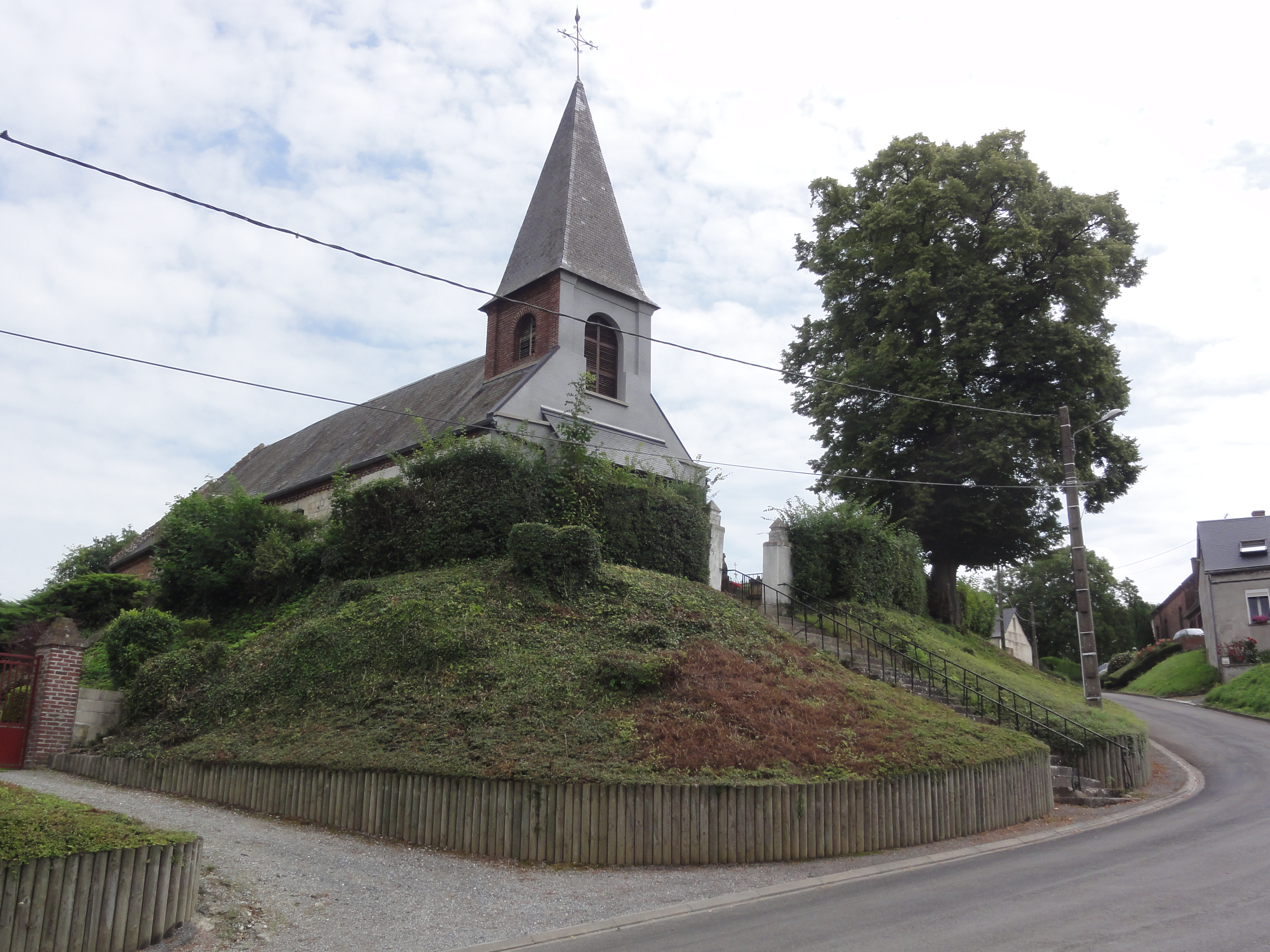
- The church of Proix
- Location of Proix
- Location within France Location within Hauts-de-France
- Coordinates: 49°54′03″N 3°34′05″E
- Country: France
- Region: Hauts-de-France
- Department: Aisne
- Arrondissement: Vervins
- Canton: Guise

Government
  - Mayor (2026–32): Caroline Lombard
- Area^{1}: 3.45 km^{2} (1.33 sq mi)
- Elevation: 84 m (276 ft)
- Highest elevation: 151 m (495 ft)
- Lowest elevation: 80 m (260 ft)
- Population (2023): 146
  - Density: 42.3/km^{2} (110/sq mi)
- Time zone: UTC+01:00 (CET)
  - Summer (DST): UTC+02:00 (CEST)
- INSEE/Postal code: 02625 /02120
- ^{1} French Land Register data, which excludes lakes, ponds, glaciers > 1 km^{2} (0.386 sq mi or 247 acres) and river estuaries.

Proix (French pronunciation: [pʁwa]) is a commune in the Aisne department in the Hauts-de-France region of northern France.

== Population ==
Historical population
Year	Pop.	±% p.a.
1968	176	—
1975	154	−1.89%
1982	152	−0.19%
1990	140	−1.02%
1999	135	−0.40%
2007	144	+0.81%
2012	150	+0.82%
2017	144	−0.81%
2023	146	+0.23%
Source: INSEE

== See also ==
- Communes of the Aisne department
