= Crupilly =

- Commune
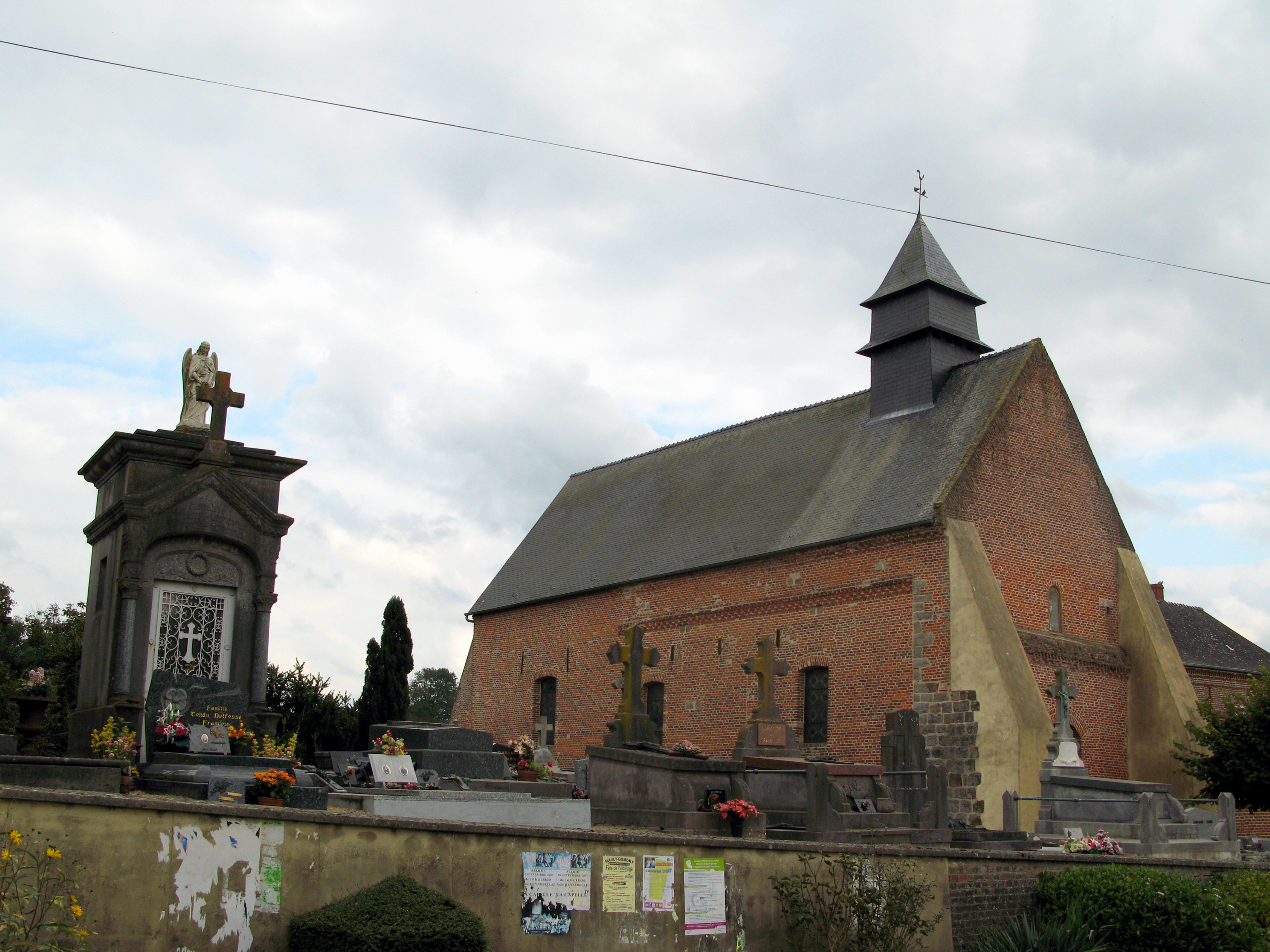
- The church of Crupilly
- Location of Crupilly
- Location within France Location within Hauts-de-France
- Coordinates: 49°55′34″N 3°45′22″E
- Country: France
- Region: Hauts-de-France
- Department: Aisne
- Arrondissement: Vervins
- Canton: Guise

Government
  - Mayor (2026–32): Odile Valliet
- Area^{1}: 3.52 km^{2} (1.36 sq mi)
- Elevation: 171 m (561 ft)
- Highest elevation: 185 m (607 ft)
- Lowest elevation: 129 m (423 ft)
- Population (2023): 64
  - Density: 18/km^{2} (47/sq mi)
- Time zone: UTC+01:00 (CET)
  - Summer (DST): UTC+02:00 (CEST)
- INSEE/Postal code: 02244 /02120
- ^{1} French Land Register data, which excludes lakes, ponds, glaciers > 1 km^{2} (0.386 sq mi or 247 acres) and river estuaries.

Crupilly is a commune in the Aisne department in Hauts-de-France in northern France.

== Population ==
Historical population
| Year | Pop. | ±% p.a. |
|---|---|---|
| 1968 | 87 | — |
| 1975 | 64 | −4.29% |
| 1982 | 63 | −0.22% |
| 1990 | 76 | +2.37% |
| 1999 | 64 | −1.89% |
| 2007 | 56 | −1.66% |
| 2012 | 74 | +5.73% |
| 2017 | 64 | −2.86% |
| 2023 | 64 | +0.00% |
Source: INSEE

== See also ==
- Communes of the Aisne department
