= Malzy =

- Commune
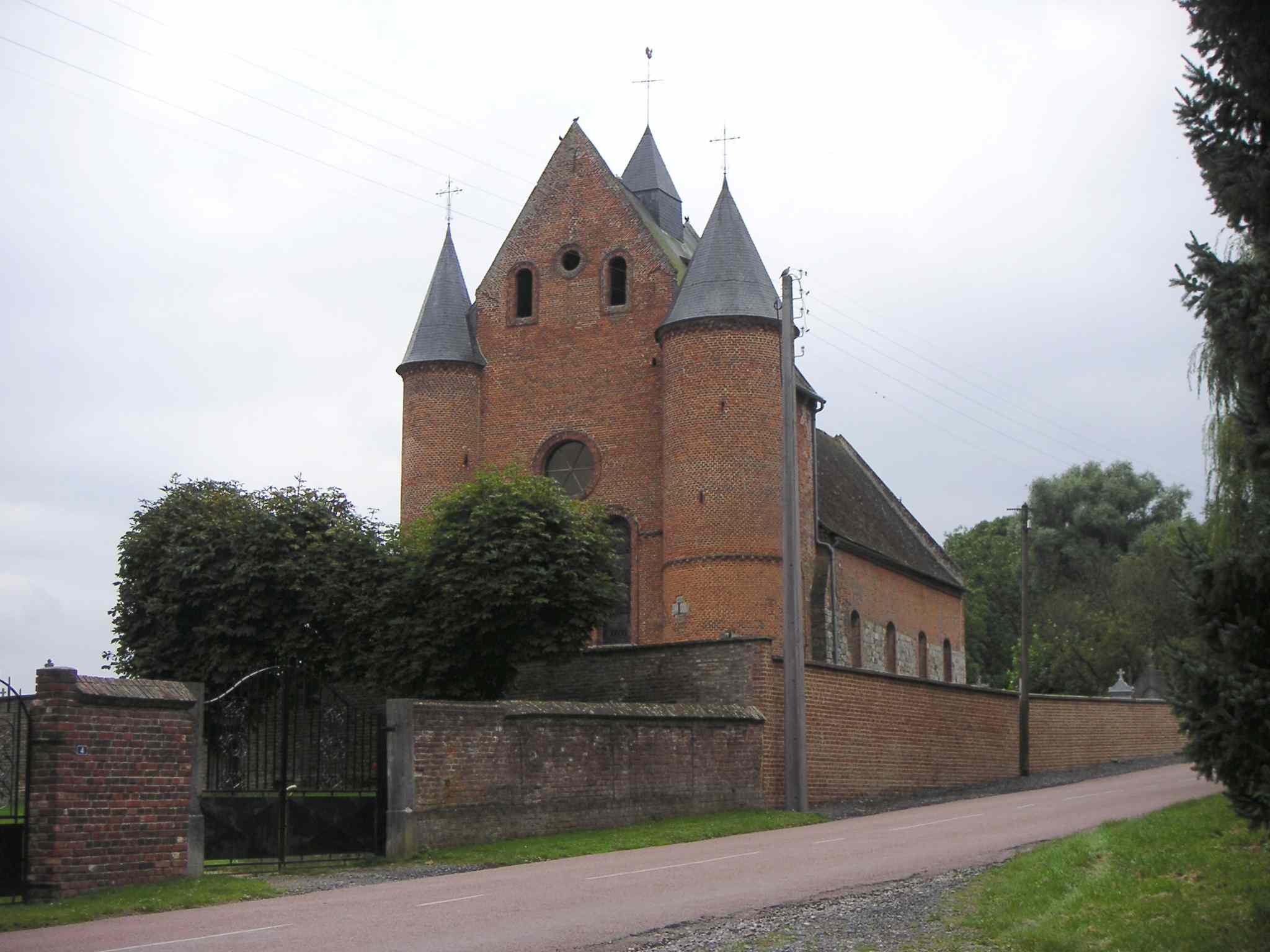
- The church of Malzy
- Location of Malzy
- Location within France Location within Hauts-de-France
- Coordinates: 49°54′30″N 3°43′41″E
- Country: France
- Region: Hauts-de-France
- Department: Aisne
- Arrondissement: Vervins
- Canton: Guise

Government
  - Mayor (2026–32): Bernard Valliet
- Area^{1}: 10.3 km^{2} (4.0 sq mi)
- Elevation: 90 m (300 ft)
- Highest elevation: 176 m (577 ft)
- Lowest elevation: 103 m (338 ft)
- Population (2023): 178
  - Density: 17.3/km^{2} (44.8/sq mi)
- Time zone: UTC+01:00 (CET)
  - Summer (DST): UTC+02:00 (CEST)
- INSEE/Postal code: 02455 /02120
- ^{1} French Land Register data, which excludes lakes, ponds, glaciers > 1 km^{2} (0.386 sq mi or 247 acres) and river estuaries.

Malzy (French pronunciation: [malzi]) is a commune in the Aisne department in Hauts-de-France in northern France.

== Population ==
Historical population
Year	Pop.	±% p.a.
1968	244	—
1975	226	−1.09%
1982	199	−1.80%
1990	195	−0.25%
1999	181	−0.82%
2007	204	+1.51%
2012	188	−1.62%
2017	203	+1.55%
2023	178	−2.17%
Source: INSEE

== See also ==
- Communes of the Aisne department
