= Lesquielles-Saint-Germain =

- Commune
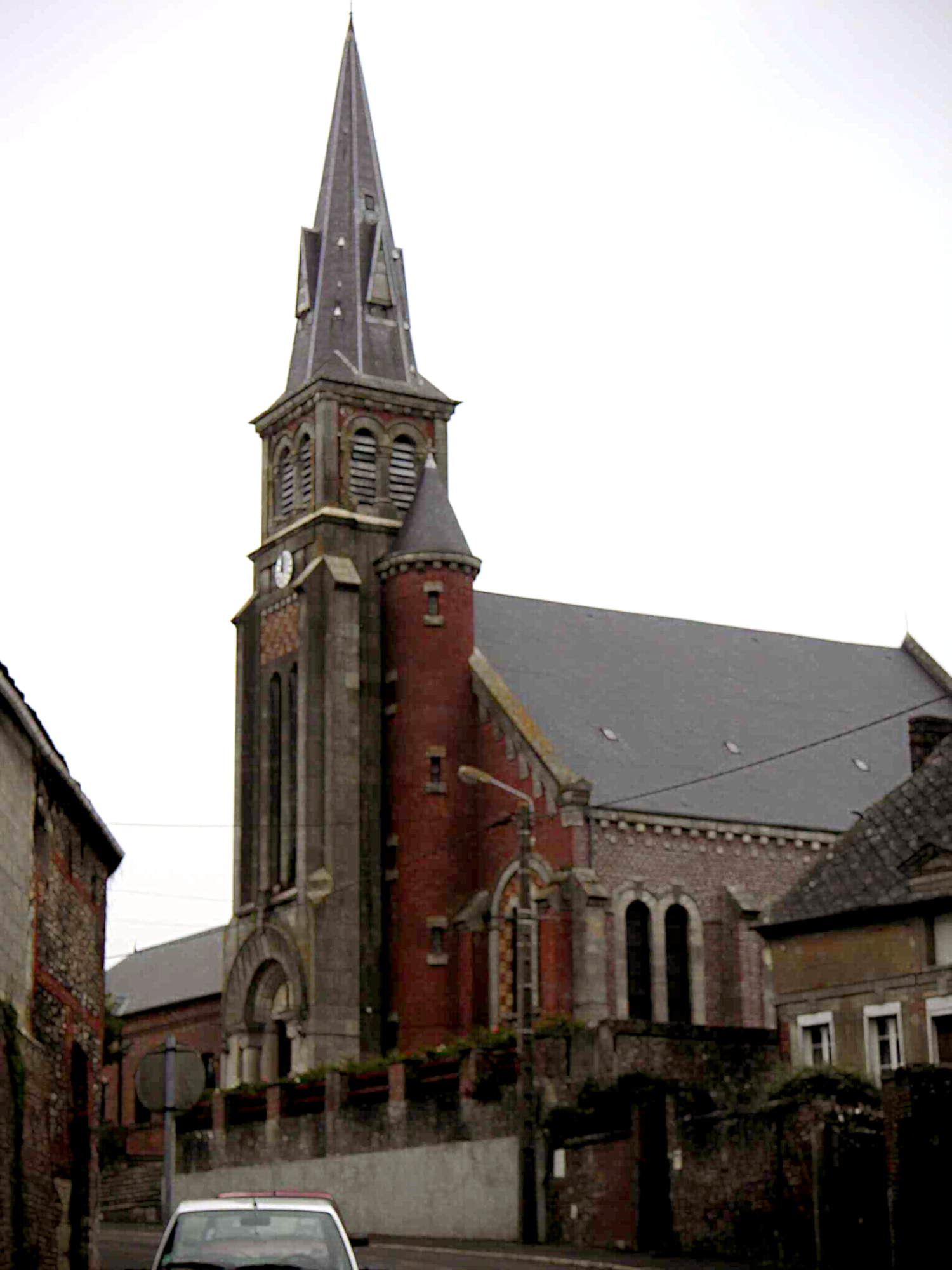
- The church of Lesquielles-Saint-Germain
- Location of Lesquielles-Saint-Germain
- Location within France Location within Hauts-de-France
- Coordinates: 49°55′55″N 3°37′19″E
- Country: France
- Region: Hauts-de-France
- Department: Aisne
- Arrondissement: Vervins
- Canton: Guise
- Intercommunality: Thiérache Sambre et Oise

Government
  - Mayor (2020–2026): Bouchra Dumange
- Area^{1}: 16.21 km^{2} (6.26 sq mi)
- Elevation: 134 m (440 ft)
- Highest elevation: 157 m (515 ft)
- Lowest elevation: 86 m (282 ft)
- Population (2023): 754
  - Density: 46.5/km^{2} (120/sq mi)
- Time zone: UTC+01:00 (CET)
  - Summer (DST): UTC+02:00 (CEST)
- INSEE/Postal code: 02422 /02120
- ^{1} French Land Register data, which excludes lakes, ponds, glaciers > 1 km^{2} (0.386 sq mi or 247 acres) and river estuaries.

Lesquielles-Saint-Germain is a commune in the Aisne department in Hauts-de-France in northern France.

== Population ==
Historical population
Year	Pop.	±% p.a.
1968	961	—
1975	852	−1.71%
1982	803	−0.84%
1990	832	+0.44%
1999	848	+0.21%
2007	863	+0.22%
2012	828	−0.82%
2017	810	−0.44%
2023	754	−1.19%
Source: INSEE

== See also ==
- Communes of the Aisne department
