= Lavaqueresse =

- Commune
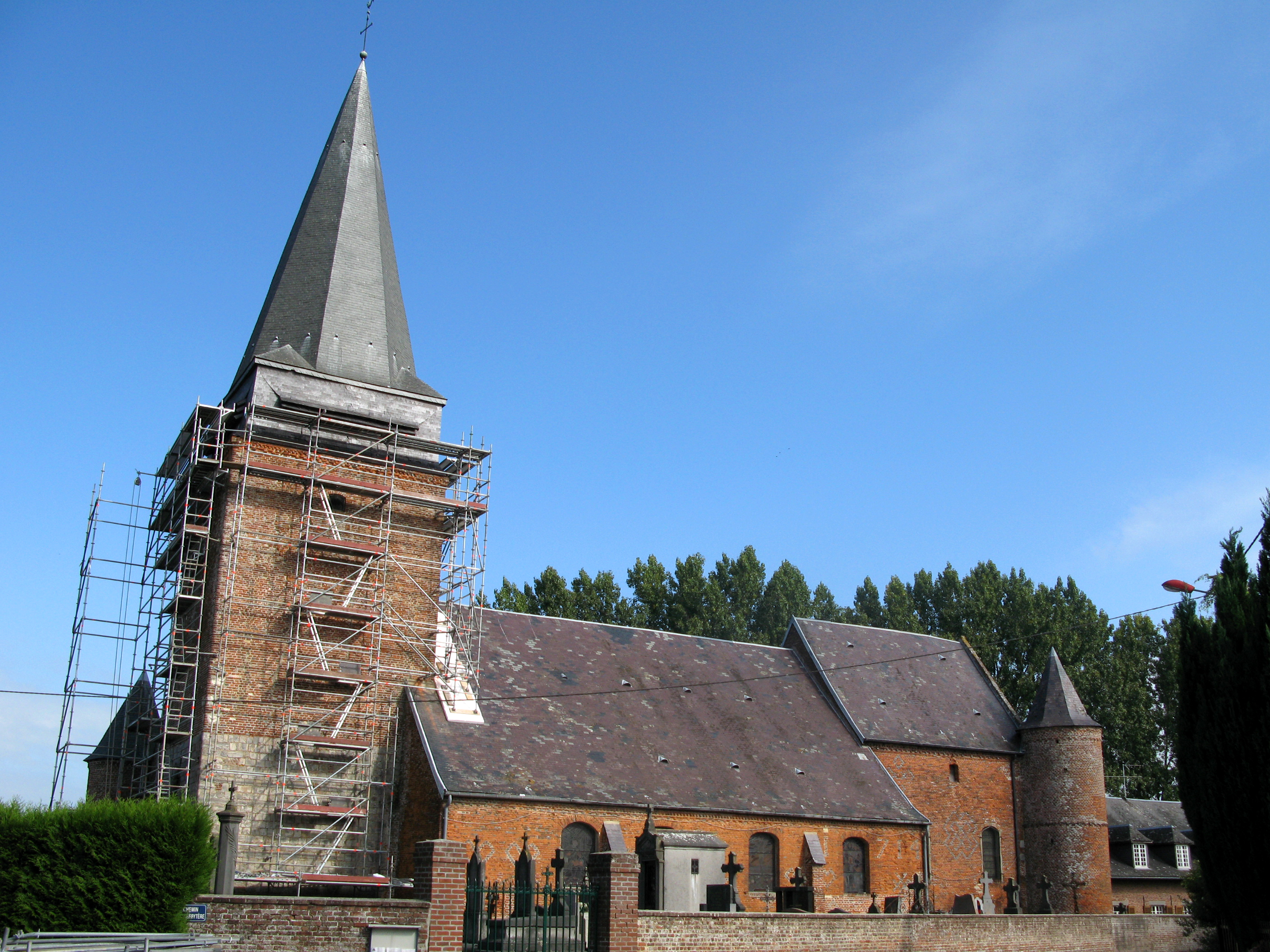
- The church of Lavaqueresse
- Location of Lavaqueresse
- Location within France Location within Hauts-de-France
- Coordinates: 49°56′59″N 3°42′39″E
- Country: France
- Region: Hauts-de-France
- Department: Aisne
- Arrondissement: Vervins
- Canton: Guise

Government
  - Mayor (2026–32): Vincent Lamotte
- Area^{1}: 4.44 km^{2} (1.71 sq mi)
- Elevation: 171 m (561 ft)
- Highest elevation: 175 m (574 ft)
- Lowest elevation: 132 m (433 ft)
- Population (2023): 203
  - Density: 45.7/km^{2} (118/sq mi)
- Time zone: UTC+01:00 (CET)
  - Summer (DST): UTC+02:00 (CEST)
- INSEE/Postal code: 02414 /02450
- ^{1} French Land Register data, which excludes lakes, ponds, glaciers > 1 km^{2} (0.386 sq mi or 247 acres) and river estuaries.

Lavaqueresse (French pronunciation: [lavakʁɛs]) is a commune in the Aisne department in Hauts-de-France in northern France.

== Population ==
Historical population
Year	Pop.	±% p.a.
1968	310	—
1975	259	−2.54%
1982	256	−0.17%
1990	224	−1.66%
1999	209	−0.77%
2007	212	+0.18%
2012	214	+0.19%
2017	202	−1.15%
2023	203	+0.08%
Source: INSEE

== See also ==
- Communes of the Aisne department
