= Vadencourt, Aisne =

Vadencourt
- Commune
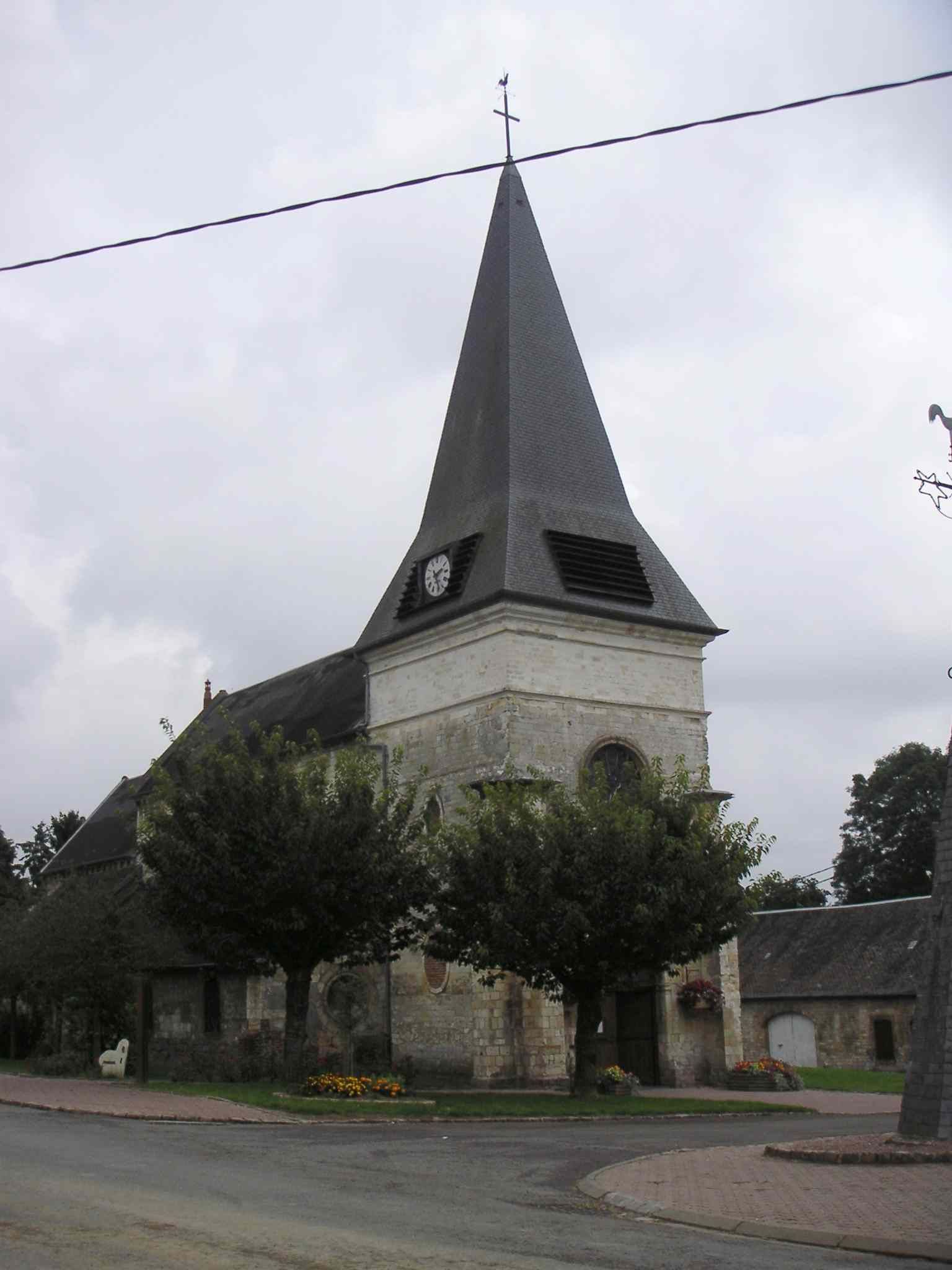
- The church of Vadencourt
- Location of Vadencourt
- Location within France Location within Hauts-de-France
- Coordinates: 49°55′48″N 3°34′47″E
- Country: France
- Region: Hauts-de-France
- Department: Aisne
- Arrondissement: Vervins
- Canton: Guise
- Intercommunality: Thiérache Sambre et Oise

Government
  - Mayor (2026–32): Patrick Mariage
- Area^{1}: 12.24 km^{2} (4.73 sq mi)
- Elevation: 88 m (289 ft)
- Highest elevation: 152 m (499 ft)
- Lowest elevation: 82 m (269 ft)
- Population (2023): 505
  - Density: 41.3/km^{2} (107/sq mi)
- Time zone: UTC+01:00 (CET)
  - Summer (DST): UTC+02:00 (CEST)
- INSEE/Postal code: 02757 /02120
- ^{1} French Land Register data, which excludes lakes, ponds, glaciers > 1 km^{2} (0.386 sq mi or 247 acres) and river estuaries.

Vadencourt (French pronunciation: [vadɑ̃kuʁ]) is a commune in the Aisne department in Hauts-de-France in northern France.

== Population ==
Historical population
Year	Pop.	±% p.a.
1968	754	—
1975	709	−0.88%
1982	664	−0.93%
1990	631	−0.64%
1999	605	−0.47%
2007	630	+0.51%
2012	598	−1.04%
2017	540	−2.02%
2023	505	−1.11%
Source: INSEE

== See also ==
- Communes of the Aisne department
