= Flavigny-le-Grand-et-Beaurain =

- Commune
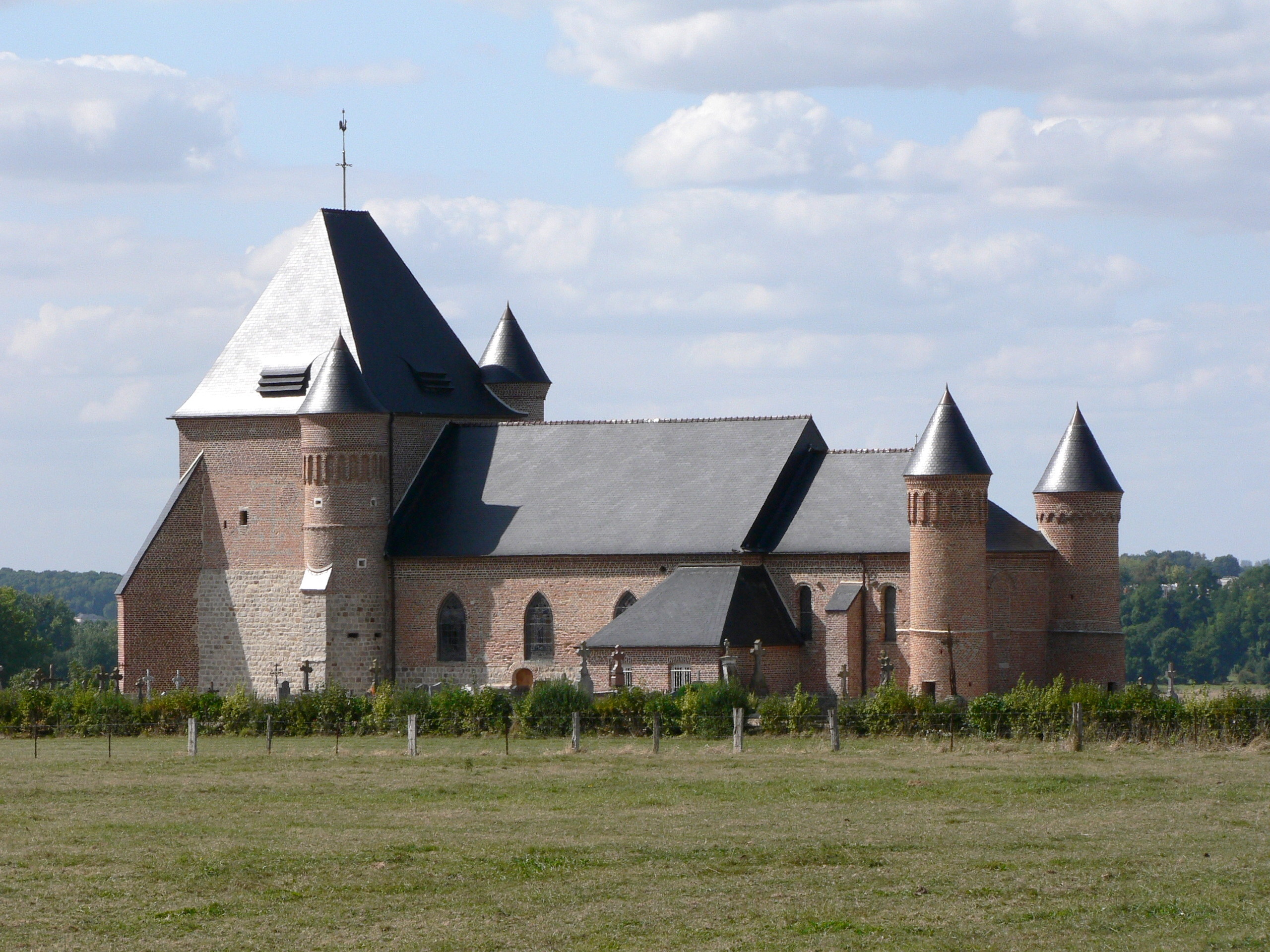
- The church of Flavigny-le-Grand-et-Beaurain
- Location of Flavigny-le-Grand-et-Beaurain
- Location within France Location within Hauts-de-France
- Coordinates: 49°53′30″N 3°39′55″E
- Country: France
- Region: Hauts-de-France
- Department: Aisne
- Arrondissement: Vervins
- Canton: Guise
- Intercommunality: Thiérache Sambre et Oise

Government
  - Mayor (2026–32): Olivier Hennechart
- Area^{1}: 13.63 km^{2} (5.26 sq mi)
- Elevation: 129 m (423 ft)
- Highest elevation: 161 m (528 ft)
- Lowest elevation: 96 m (315 ft)
- Population (2023): 420
  - Density: 31/km^{2} (80/sq mi)
- Time zone: UTC+01:00 (CET)
  - Summer (DST): UTC+02:00 (CEST)
- INSEE/Postal code: 02313 /02120
- ^{1} French Land Register data, which excludes lakes, ponds, glaciers > 1 km^{2} (0.386 sq mi or 247 acres) and river estuaries.

Flavigny-le-Grand-et-Beaurain (French pronunciation: [flaviɲi lə ɡʁɑ̃ e boʁɛ̃]) is a commune in the Aisne department in Hauts-de-France in northern France.

== Population ==
Historical population
Year	Pop.	±% p.a.
1968	563	—
1975	505	−1.54%
1982	478	−0.78%
1990	466	−0.32%
1999	464	−0.05%
2007	439	−0.69%
2012	480	+1.80%
2017	468	−0.51%
2023	420	−1.79%
Source: INSEE

== See also ==
- Communes of the Aisne department
