= Villers-lès-Guise =

- Commune
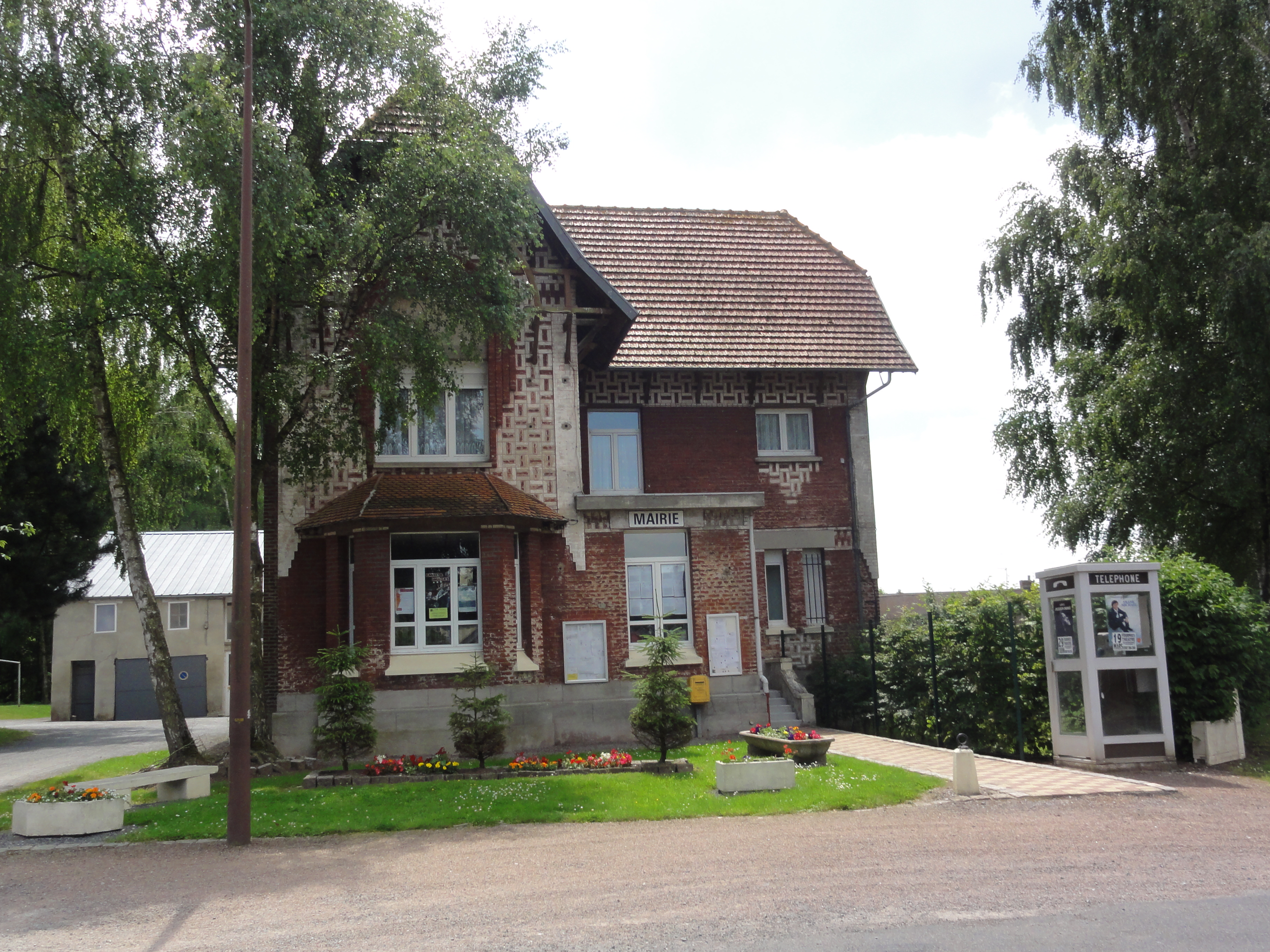
- The town hall of Villers-lès-Guise
- Location of Villers-lès-Guise
- Location within France Location within Hauts-de-France
- Coordinates: 49°55′11″N 3°40′44″E
- Country: France
- Region: Hauts-de-France
- Department: Aisne
- Arrondissement: Vervins
- Canton: Guise

Government
  - Mayor (2026–32): Eric Vanneste
- Area^{1}: 8.06 km^{2} (3.11 sq mi)
- Elevation: 154 m (505 ft)
- Highest elevation: 163 m (535 ft)
- Lowest elevation: 130 m (430 ft)
- Population (2023): 166
  - Density: 20.6/km^{2} (53.3/sq mi)
- Time zone: UTC+01:00 (CET)
  - Summer (DST): UTC+02:00 (CEST)
- INSEE/Postal code: 02814 /02120
- ^{1} French Land Register data, which excludes lakes, ponds, glaciers > 1 km^{2} (0.386 sq mi or 247 acres) and river estuaries.

Villers-lès-Guise (French pronunciation: [vilɛʁ lɛ ɡɥiz], literally Villers near Guise) is a commune in the Aisne department in Hauts-de-France in northern France.

== Population ==
Historical population
Year	Pop.	±% p.a.
1968	250	—
1975	199	−3.21%
1982	195	−0.29%
1990	203	+0.50%
1999	182	−1.21%
2007	174	−0.56%
2012	164	−1.18%
2017	169	+0.60%
2023	166	−0.30%
Source: INSEE

== See also ==
- Communes of the Aisne department
