= Monceau-sur-Oise =

- Commune
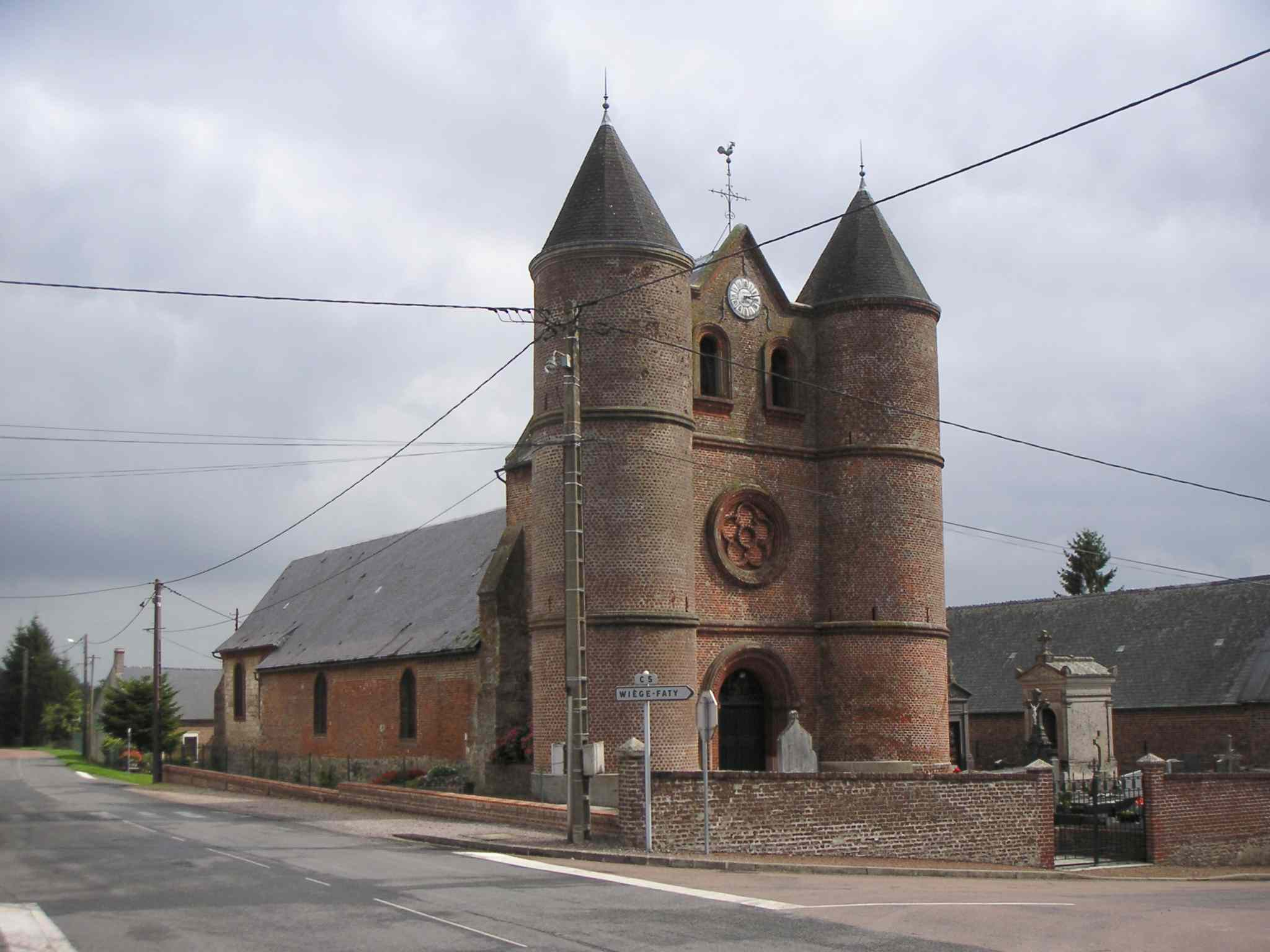
- The fortress church of Monceau-sur-Oise

- Coat of arms
- Location of Monceau-sur-Oise
- Location within France Location within Hauts-de-France
- Coordinates: 49°54′08″N 3°41′47″E
- Country: France
- Region: Hauts-de-France
- Department: Aisne
- Arrondissement: Vervins
- Canton: Guise

Government
  - Mayor (2026–32): Marie-Claire Fortin
- Area^{1}: 5.86 km^{2} (2.26 sq mi)
- Elevation: 108 m (354 ft)
- Highest elevation: 164 m (538 ft)
- Lowest elevation: 101 m (331 ft)
- Population (2023): 132
  - Density: 22.5/km^{2} (58.3/sq mi)
- Time zone: UTC+01:00 (CET)
  - Summer (DST): UTC+02:00 (CEST)
- INSEE/Postal code: 02494 /02120
- ^{1} French Land Register data, which excludes lakes, ponds, glaciers > 1 km^{2} (0.386 sq mi or 247 acres) and river estuaries.

Monceau-sur-Oise (French pronunciation: [mɔ̃so syʁ waz], literally Monceau on Oise) is a commune in the Aisne department in Hauts-de-France in northern France.

== Population ==
Historical population
| Year | Pop. | ±% p.a. |
|---|---|---|
| 1968 | 178 | — |
| 1975 | 109 | −6.77% |
| 1982 | 128 | +2.32% |
| 1990 | 127 | −0.10% |
| 1999 | 142 | +1.25% |
| 2007 | 124 | −1.68% |
| 2012 | 112 | −2.02% |
| 2017 | 128 | +2.71% |
| 2023 | 132 | +0.51% |
Source: INSEE

== See also ==
- Communes of the Aisne department
