= Esquéhéries =

- Commune
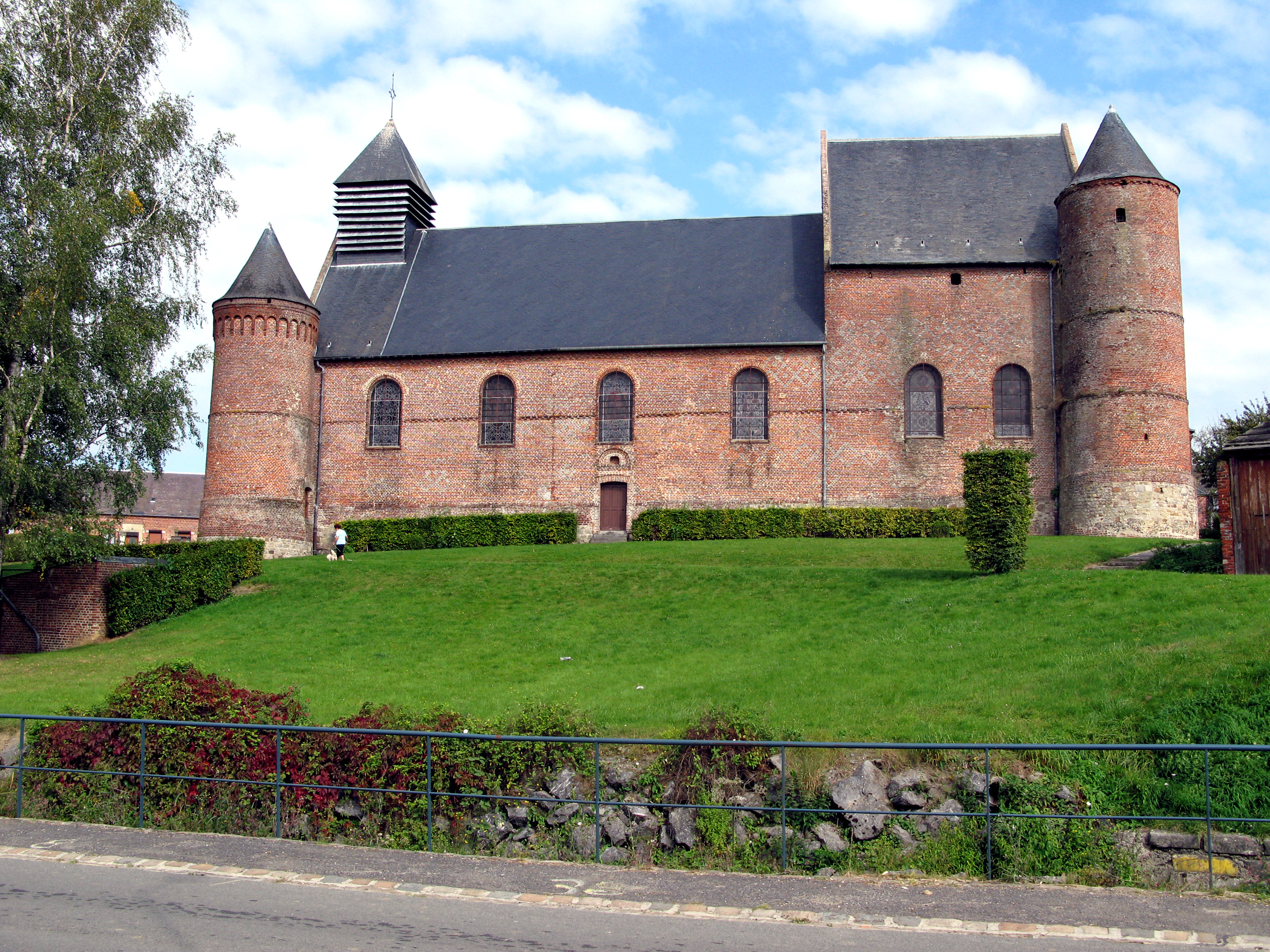
- The church of Esquéhéries

- Coat of arms
- Location of Esquéhéries
- Location within France Location within Hauts-de-France
- Coordinates: 49°59′05″N 3°44′50″E
- Country: France
- Region: Hauts-de-France
- Department: Aisne
- Arrondissement: Vervins
- Canton: Guise
- Intercommunality: Thiérache du Centre

Government
  - Mayor (2026–32): Alain Compere
- Area^{1}: 16.21 km^{2} (6.26 sq mi)
- Elevation: 182 m (597 ft)
- Highest elevation: 199 m (653 ft)
- Lowest elevation: 144 m (472 ft)
- Population (2023): 847
  - Density: 52.3/km^{2} (135/sq mi)
- Time zone: UTC+01:00 (CET)
  - Summer (DST): UTC+02:00 (CEST)
- INSEE/Postal code: 02286 /02170
- ^{1} French Land Register data, which excludes lakes, ponds, glaciers > 1 km^{2} (0.386 sq mi or 247 acres) and river estuaries.

Esquéhéries (French pronunciation: [eke.eʁi]) is a commune in the Aisne department in Hauts-de-France in northern France.

== Population ==
Historical population
Year	Pop.	±% p.a.
1968	1,164	—
1975	1,061	−1.31%
1982	1,010	−0.70%
1990	1,005	−0.06%
1999	866	−1.64%
2007	857	−0.13%
2012	842	−0.35%
2017	858	+0.38%
2023	847	−0.21%
Source: INSEE

== See also ==
- Communes of the Aisne department
