= Bergues-sur-Sambre =

- Commune
- Location of Bergues-sur-Sambre
- Location within France Location within Hauts-de-France
- Coordinates: 50°02′03″N 3°42′24″E
- Country: France
- Region: Hauts-de-France
- Department: Aisne
- Arrondissement: Vervins
- Canton: Guise
- Intercommunality: Thiérache du Centre

Government
  - Mayor (2026–32): Frédéric Lacoche
- Area^{1}: 4.41 km^{2} (1.70 sq mi)
- Elevation: 172 m (564 ft)
- Highest elevation: 189 m (620 ft)
- Lowest elevation: 142 m (466 ft)
- Population (2023): 205
  - Density: 46.5/km^{2} (120/sq mi)
- Time zone: UTC+01:00 (CET)
  - Summer (DST): UTC+02:00 (CEST)
- INSEE/Postal code: 02067 /02450
- ^{1} French Land Register data, which excludes lakes, ponds, glaciers > 1 km^{2} (0.386 sq mi or 247 acres) and river estuaries.

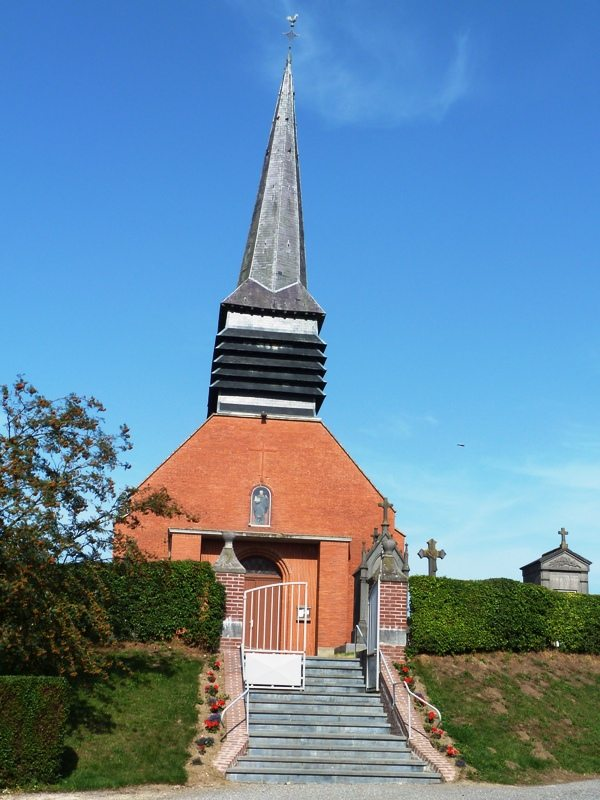
BERGUES SUR SAMBRE

Bergues-sur-Sambre (French pronunciation: [bɛʁɡ syʁ sɑ̃bʁ], literally Bergues on Sambre) is a commune in the department of Aisne in Hauts-de-France in the northern part of France.

== Population ==
Historical population
Year	Pop.	±% p.a.
1968	269	—
1975	264	−0.27%
1982	239	−1.41%
1990	211	−1.55%
1999	195	−0.87%
2007	201	+0.38%
2012	221	+1.92%
2017	213	−0.73%
2023	205	−0.64%
Source: INSEE

== See also ==
- Communes of the Aisne department
