= Leschelle =

- Commune
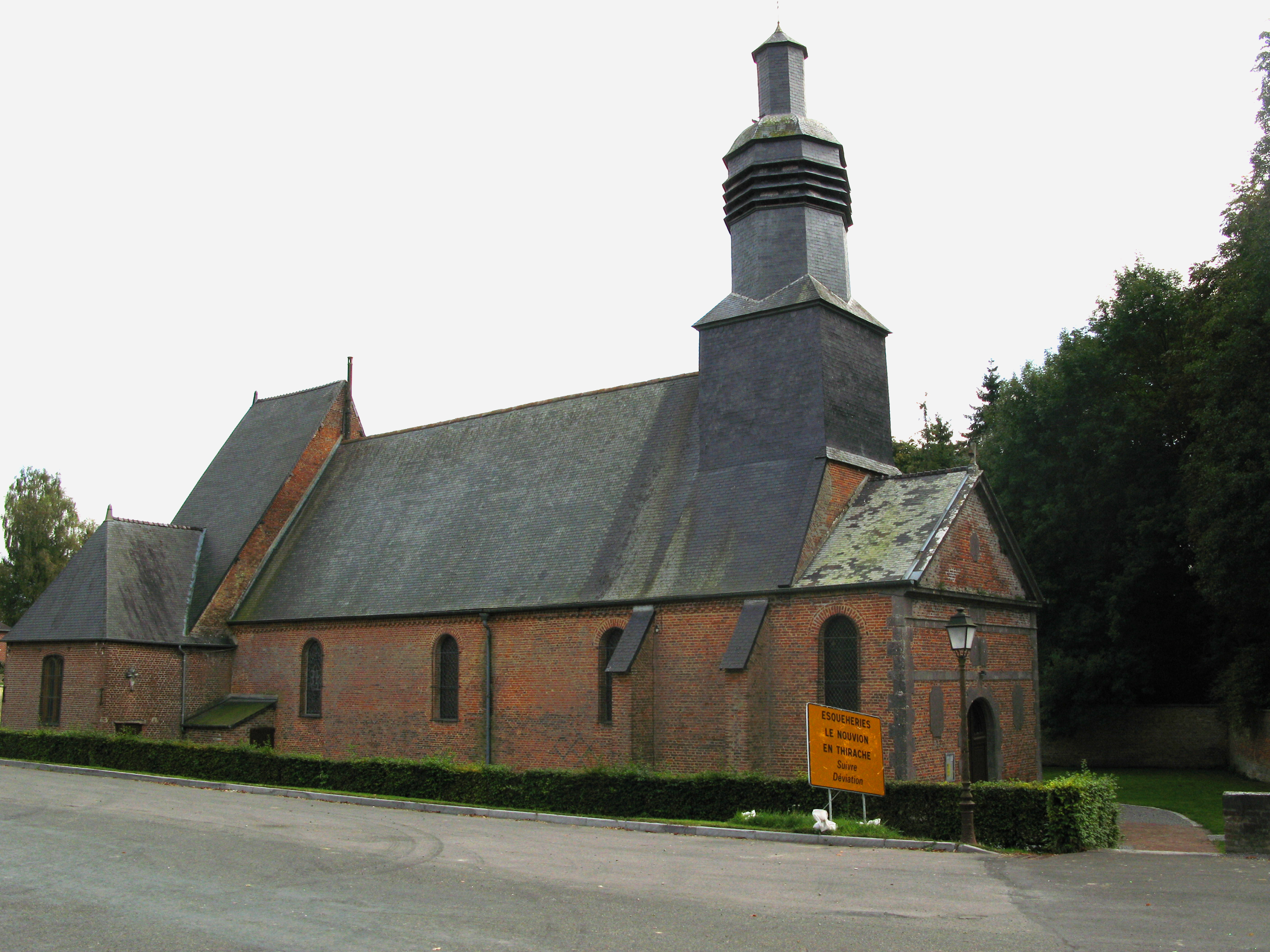
- The church of Leschelle
- Location of Leschelle
- Location within France Location within Hauts-de-France
- Coordinates: 49°57′34″N 3°46′18″E
- Country: France
- Region: Hauts-de-France
- Department: Aisne
- Arrondissement: Vervins
- Canton: Guise
- Intercommunality: Thiérache du Centre

Government
  - Mayor (2026–32): Alain Marquant
- Area^{1}: 14.69 km^{2} (5.67 sq mi)
- Elevation: 180 m (590 ft)
- Highest elevation: 206 m (676 ft)
- Lowest elevation: 144 m (472 ft)
- Population (2023): 269
  - Density: 18.3/km^{2} (47.4/sq mi)
- Time zone: UTC+01:00 (CET)
  - Summer (DST): UTC+02:00 (CEST)
- INSEE/Postal code: 02419 /02170
- ^{1} French Land Register data, which excludes lakes, ponds, glaciers > 1 km^{2} (0.386 sq mi or 247 acres) and river estuaries.

Leschelle (French pronunciation: [leʃɛl], before 2008: Leschelles) is a commune in the Aisne department in Hauts-de-France in northern France.

== Population ==
Historical population
Year	Pop.	±% p.a.
1968	415	—
1975	335	−3.01%
1982	351	+0.67%
1990	305	−1.74%
1999	282	−0.87%
2007	283	+0.04%
2012	291	+0.56%
2017	270	−1.49%
2023	269	−0.06%
Source: INSEE

== See also ==
- Communes of the Aisne department
