= Vénérolles =

- Commune
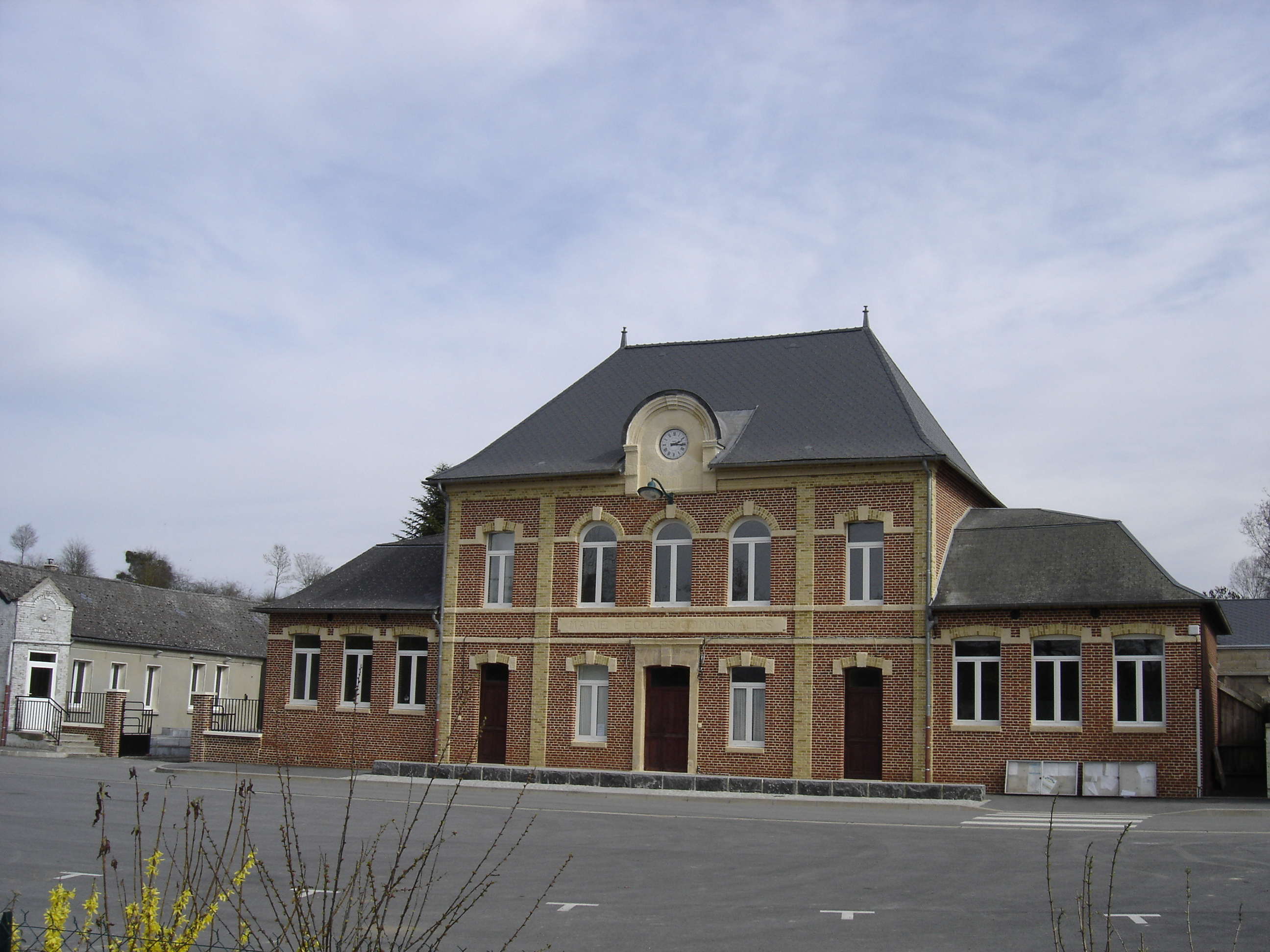
- Town hall
- Location of Vénérolles
- Location within France Location within Hauts-de-France
- Coordinates: 49°59′00″N 3°38′25″E
- Country: France
- Region: Hauts-de-France
- Department: Aisne
- Arrondissement: Vervins
- Canton: Guise
- Intercommunality: Thiérache Sambre et Oise

Government
  - Mayor (2026–32): Maxime Puche
- Area^{1}: 8.89 km^{2} (3.43 sq mi)
- Elevation: 154 m (505 ft)
- Highest elevation: 186 m (610 ft)
- Lowest elevation: 106 m (348 ft)
- Population (2023): 229
  - Density: 25.8/km^{2} (66.7/sq mi)
- Time zone: UTC+01:00 (CET)
  - Summer (DST): UTC+02:00 (CEST)
- INSEE/Postal code: 02779 /02510
- ^{1} French Land Register data, which excludes lakes, ponds, glaciers > 1 km^{2} (0.386 sq mi or 247 acres) and river estuaries.

Vénérolles (French pronunciation: [veneʁɔl]) is a commune in the Aisne department in Hauts-de-France in northern France. It is 10 km north of Guise, and 40 km south east of Cambrai.

The church of Saint-Timothée dates from the 16th century.

The Canal de la Sambre à l'Oise flows through the village.

== Population ==
Historical population
Year	Pop.	±% p.a.
1968	327	—
1975	278	−2.29%
1982	268	−0.52%
1990	260	−0.38%
1999	265	+0.21%
2007	228	−1.86%
2012	226	−0.18%
2017	223	−0.27%
2023	229	+0.44%
Source: INSEE

== See also ==
- Communes of the Aisne department
