= Tupigny =

- Commune
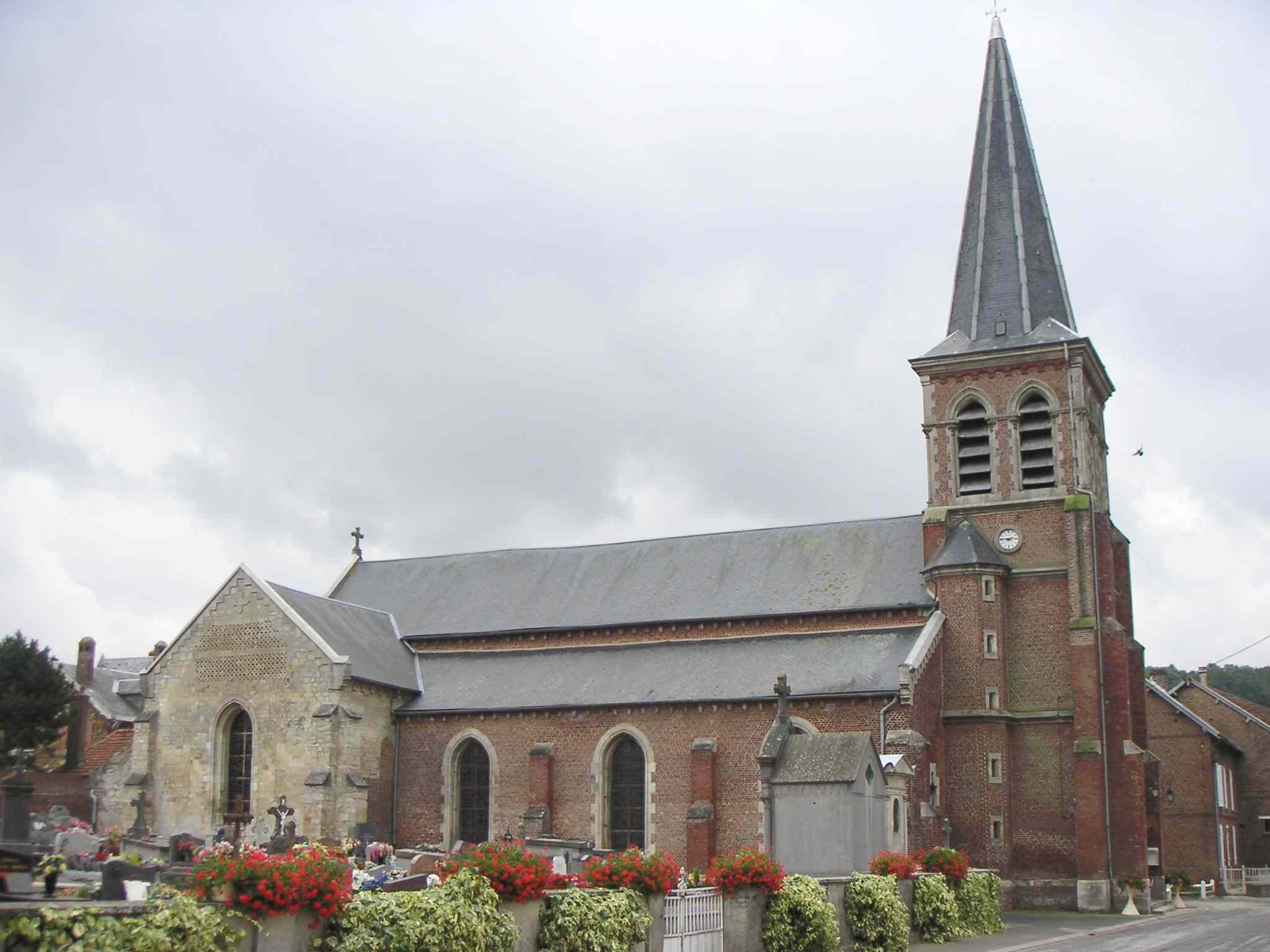
- The church of Tupigny

- Coat of arms
- Location of Tupigny
- Location within France Location within Hauts-de-France
- Coordinates: 49°57′28″N 3°36′30″E
- Country: France
- Region: Hauts-de-France
- Department: Aisne
- Arrondissement: Vervins
- Canton: Guise

Government
  - Mayor (2026–32): Jean-Luc Egret
- Area^{1}: 12.84 km^{2} (4.96 sq mi)
- Elevation: 125 m (410 ft)
- Highest elevation: 178 m (584 ft)
- Lowest elevation: 95 m (312 ft)
- Population (2023): 341
  - Density: 26.6/km^{2} (68.8/sq mi)
- Time zone: UTC+01:00 (CET)
  - Summer (DST): UTC+02:00 (CEST)
- INSEE/Postal code: 02753 /02120
- ^{1} French Land Register data, which excludes lakes, ponds, glaciers > 1 km^{2} (0.386 sq mi or 247 acres) and river estuaries.

Tupigny (French pronunciation: [typiɲi]) is a commune in the Aisne department in Hauts-de-France in northern France.

== Population ==
Historical population
| Year | Pop. | ±% p.a. |
|---|---|---|
| 1968 | 436 | — |
| 1975 | 381 | −1.91% |
| 1982 | 330 | −2.03% |
| 1990 | 348 | +0.67% |
| 1999 | 350 | +0.06% |
| 2007 | 360 | +0.35% |
| 2012 | 356 | −0.22% |
| 2017 | 335 | −1.21% |
| 2023 | 341 | +0.30% |
Source: INSEE

== See also ==
- Communes of the Aisne department
