= Romery, Aisne =

Romery
- Commune
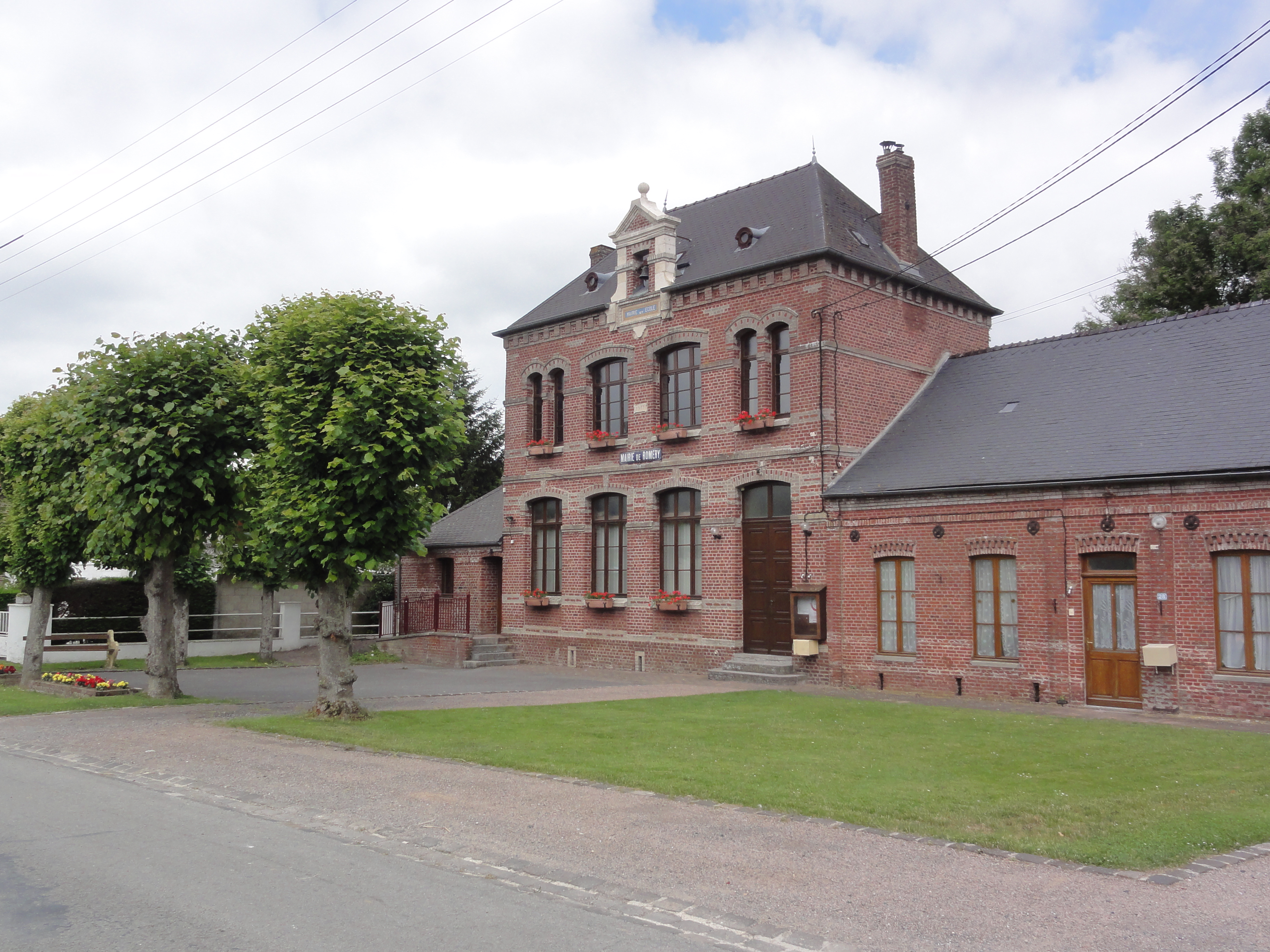
- The town hall of Romery
- Location of Romery
- Location within France Location within Hauts-de-France
- Coordinates: 49°53′52″N 3°43′31″E
- Country: France
- Region: Hauts-de-France
- Department: Aisne
- Arrondissement: Vervins
- Canton: Guise

Government
  - Mayor (2026–32): Marcel Decorte
- Area^{1}: 3.96 km^{2} (1.53 sq mi)
- Elevation: 47 m (154 ft)
- Highest elevation: 168 m (551 ft)
- Lowest elevation: 102 m (335 ft)
- Population (2023): 83
  - Density: 21/km^{2} (54/sq mi)
- Time zone: UTC+01:00 (CET)
  - Summer (DST): UTC+02:00 (CEST)
- INSEE/Postal code: 02654 /02120
- ^{1} French Land Register data, which excludes lakes, ponds, glaciers > 1 km^{2} (0.386 sq mi or 247 acres) and river estuaries.

Romery (French pronunciation: [ʁɔmʁi]) is a commune in the Aisne department in Hauts-de-France in northern France.

== Population ==
Historical population
Year	Pop.	±% p.a.
1968	108	—
1975	65	−7.00%
1982	56	−2.11%
1990	58	+0.44%
1999	63	+0.92%
2007	79	+2.87%
2012	88	+2.18%
2017	82	−1.40%
2023	83	+0.20%
Source: INSEE

== See also ==
- Communes of the Aisne department
