= Mennevret =

- Commune
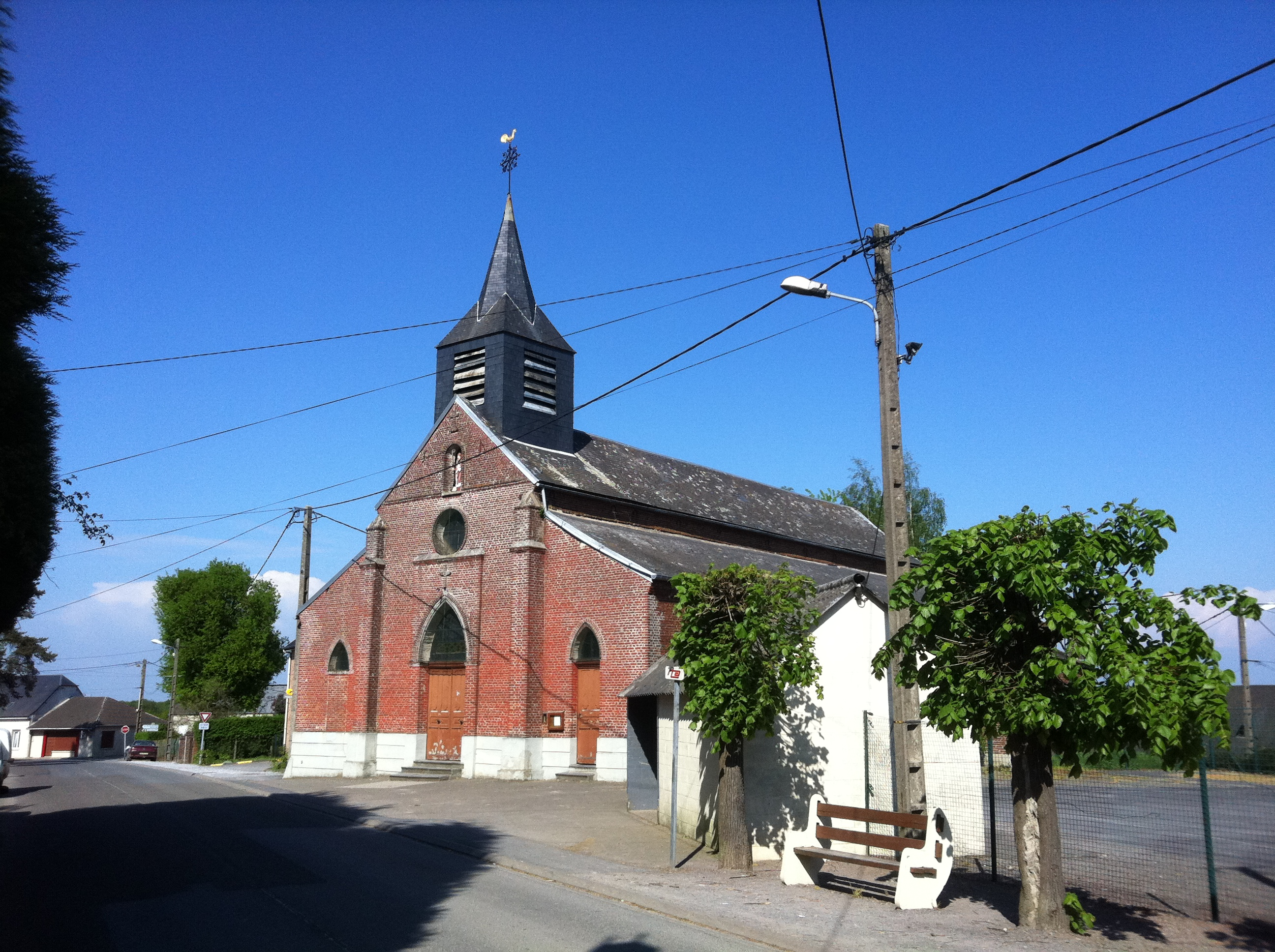
- The church of Mennevret
- Location of Mennevret
- Location within France Location within Hauts-de-France
- Coordinates: 49°59′07″N 3°33′25″E
- Country: France
- Region: Hauts-de-France
- Department: Aisne
- Arrondissement: Vervins
- Canton: Guise

Government
  - Mayor (2026–32): Jean-Luc Hannard
- Area^{1}: 11.89 km^{2} (4.59 sq mi)
- Elevation: 150 m (490 ft)
- Highest elevation: 176 m (577 ft)
- Lowest elevation: 134 m (440 ft)
- Population (2023): 637
  - Density: 53.6/km^{2} (139/sq mi)
- Time zone: UTC+01:00 (CET)
  - Summer (DST): UTC+02:00 (CEST)
- INSEE/Postal code: 02476 /02630
- ^{1} French Land Register data, which excludes lakes, ponds, glaciers > 1 km^{2} (0.386 sq mi or 247 acres) and river estuaries.

Mennevret (French pronunciation: [mɛnəvʁɛ]) is a commune in the Aisne department in Hauts-de-France in northern France. Notable attractions include the "Berlemont Floreal" flower garden.

== Population ==
Historical population
| Year | Pop. | ±% p.a. |
|---|---|---|
| 1968 | 770 | — |
| 1975 | 703 | −1.29% |
| 1982 | 649 | −1.14% |
| 1990 | 656 | +0.13% |
| 1999 | 653 | −0.05% |
| 2007 | 666 | +0.25% |
| 2012 | 644 | −0.67% |
| 2017 | 651 | +0.22% |
| 2023 | 637 | −0.36% |
Source: INSEE

== See also ==
- Communes of the Aisne department
