= Molain, Aisne =

Molain
- Commune
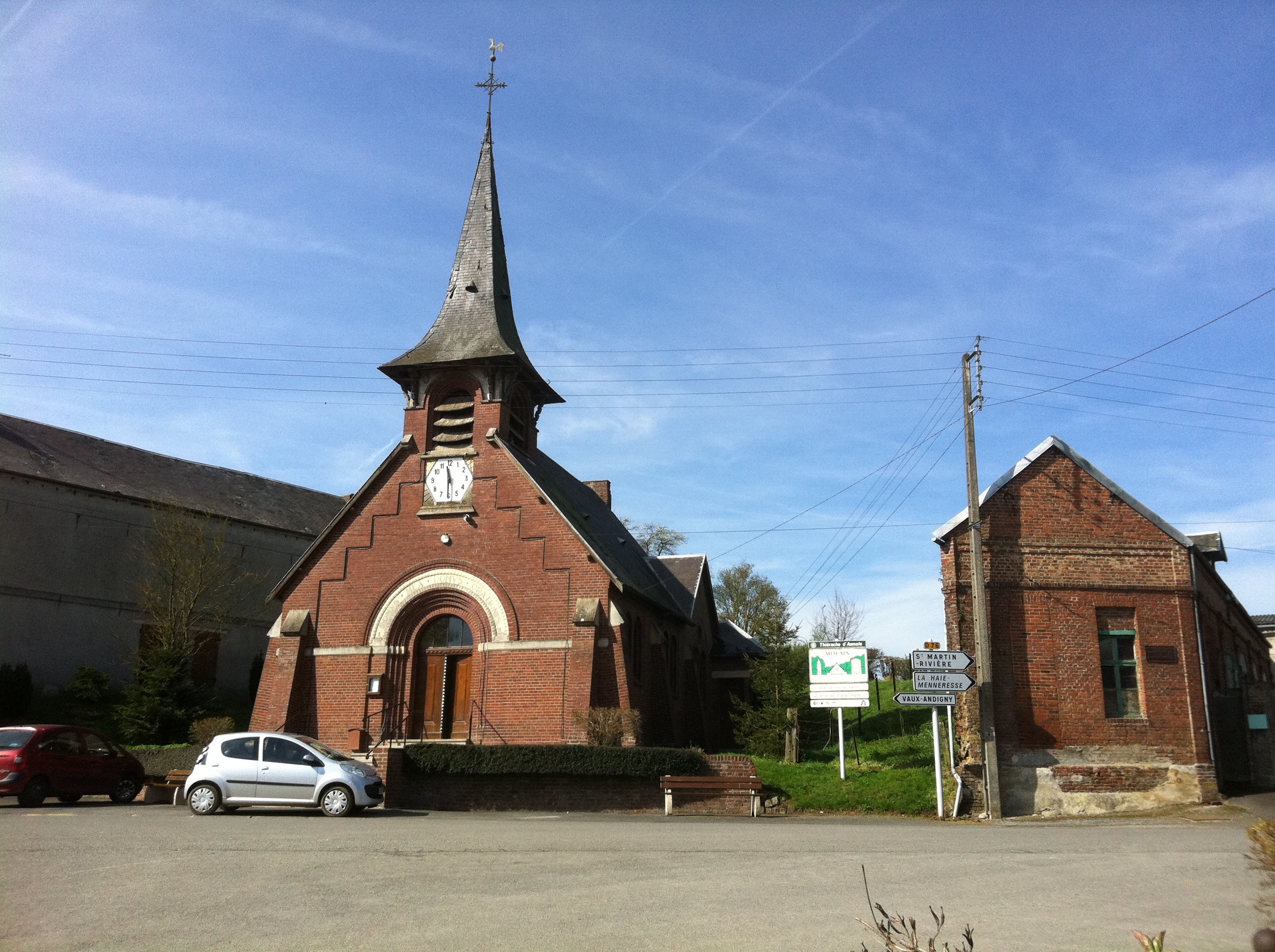
- The church of Molain
- Location of Molain
- Location within France Location within Hauts-de-France
- Coordinates: 50°01′54″N 3°32′07″E
- Country: France
- Region: Hauts-de-France
- Department: Aisne
- Arrondissement: Vervins
- Canton: Guise

Government
  - Mayor (2026–32): Olivier Mahieux
- Area^{1}: 1.81 km^{2} (0.70 sq mi)
- Elevation: 150 m (490 ft)
- Highest elevation: 156 m (512 ft)
- Lowest elevation: 116 m (381 ft)
- Population (2023): 161
  - Density: 89.0/km^{2} (230/sq mi)
- Time zone: UTC+01:00 (CET)
  - Summer (DST): UTC+02:00 (CEST)
- INSEE/Postal code: 02488 /02110
- ^{1} French Land Register data, which excludes lakes, ponds, glaciers > 1 km^{2} (0.386 sq mi or 247 acres) and river estuaries.

Molain (French pronunciation: [mɔlɛ̃]) is a commune in the Aisne department in Hauts-de-France in northern France.

== Population ==
Historical population
| Year | Pop. | ±% p.a. |
|---|---|---|
| 1968 | 188 | — |
| 1975 | 162 | −2.10% |
| 1982 | 168 | +0.52% |
| 1990 | 156 | −0.92% |
| 1999 | 151 | −0.36% |
| 2007 | 151 | +0.00% |
| 2012 | 147 | −0.54% |
| 2017 | 152 | +0.67% |
| 2023 | 161 | +0.96% |
Source: INSEE

== See also ==
- Communes of the Aisne department
