= Chigny, Aisne =

Chigny
- Commune
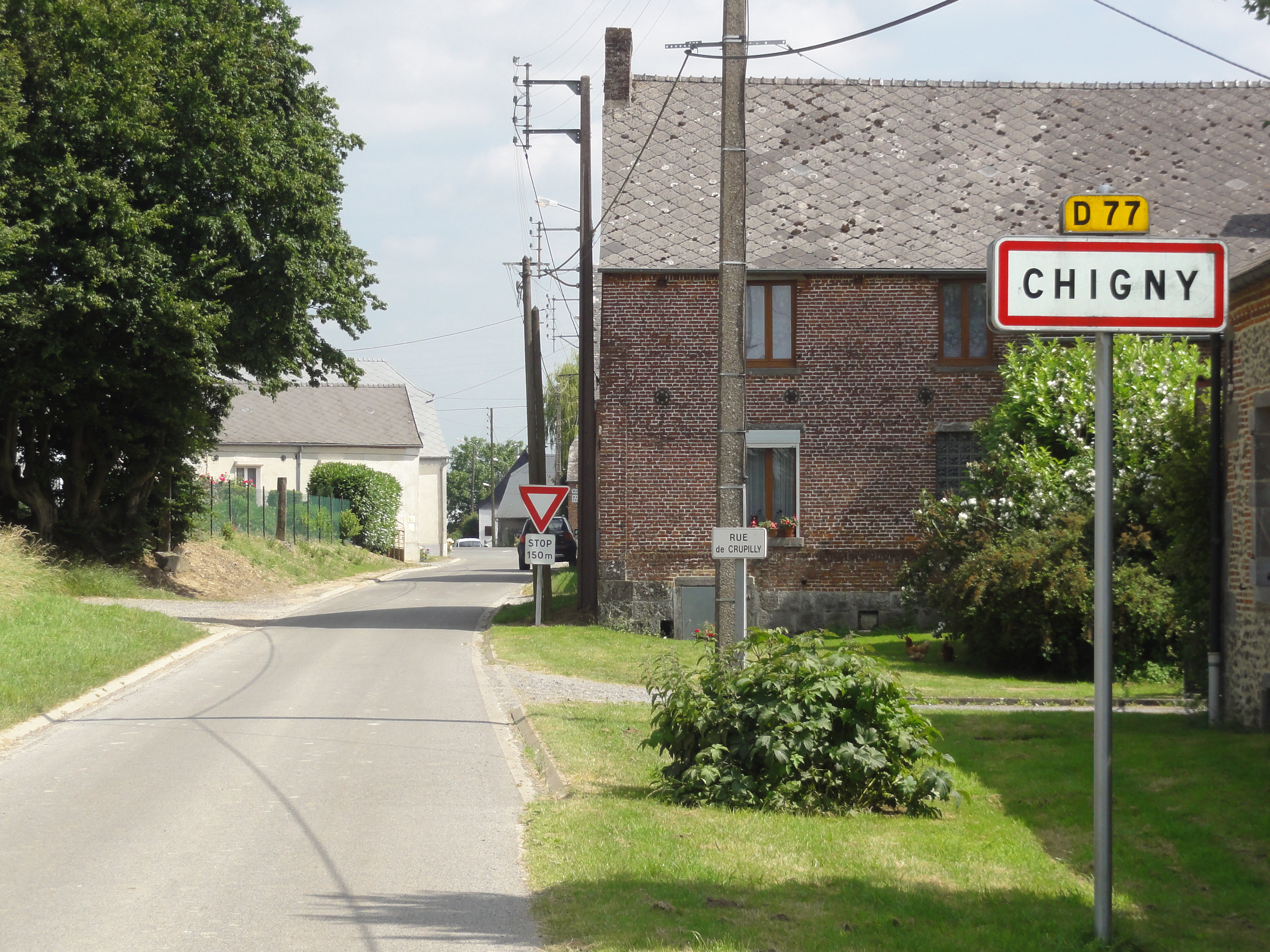
- The road into Chigny

- Coat of arms
- Location of Chigny
- Location within France Location within Hauts-de-France
- Coordinates: 49°55′07″N 3°46′18″E
- Country: France
- Region: Hauts-de-France
- Department: Aisne
- Arrondissement: Vervins
- Canton: Guise

Government
  - Mayor (2026–32): Christine Watremez
- Area^{1}: 10.47 km^{2} (4.04 sq mi)
- Elevation: 170 m (560 ft)
- Highest elevation: 198 m (650 ft)
- Lowest elevation: 107 m (351 ft)
- Population (2023): 140
  - Density: 13/km^{2} (35/sq mi)
- Time zone: UTC+01:00 (CET)
  - Summer (DST): UTC+02:00 (CEST)
- INSEE/Postal code: 02188 /02120
- ^{1} French Land Register data, which excludes lakes, ponds, glaciers > 1 km^{2} (0.386 sq mi or 247 acres) and river estuaries.

Chigny (French pronunciation: [ʃiɲi]) is a commune in the Aisne department in Hauts-de-France in northern France.

== Population ==
Historical population
Year	Pop.	±% p.a.
1968	234	—
1975	216	−1.14%
1982	161	−4.11%
1990	175	+1.05%
1999	161	−0.92%
2007	174	+0.98%
2012	144	−3.71%
2017	149	+0.68%
2023	140	−1.03%
Source: INSEE

== See also ==
- Communes of the Aisne department
