= Grougis =

- Commune
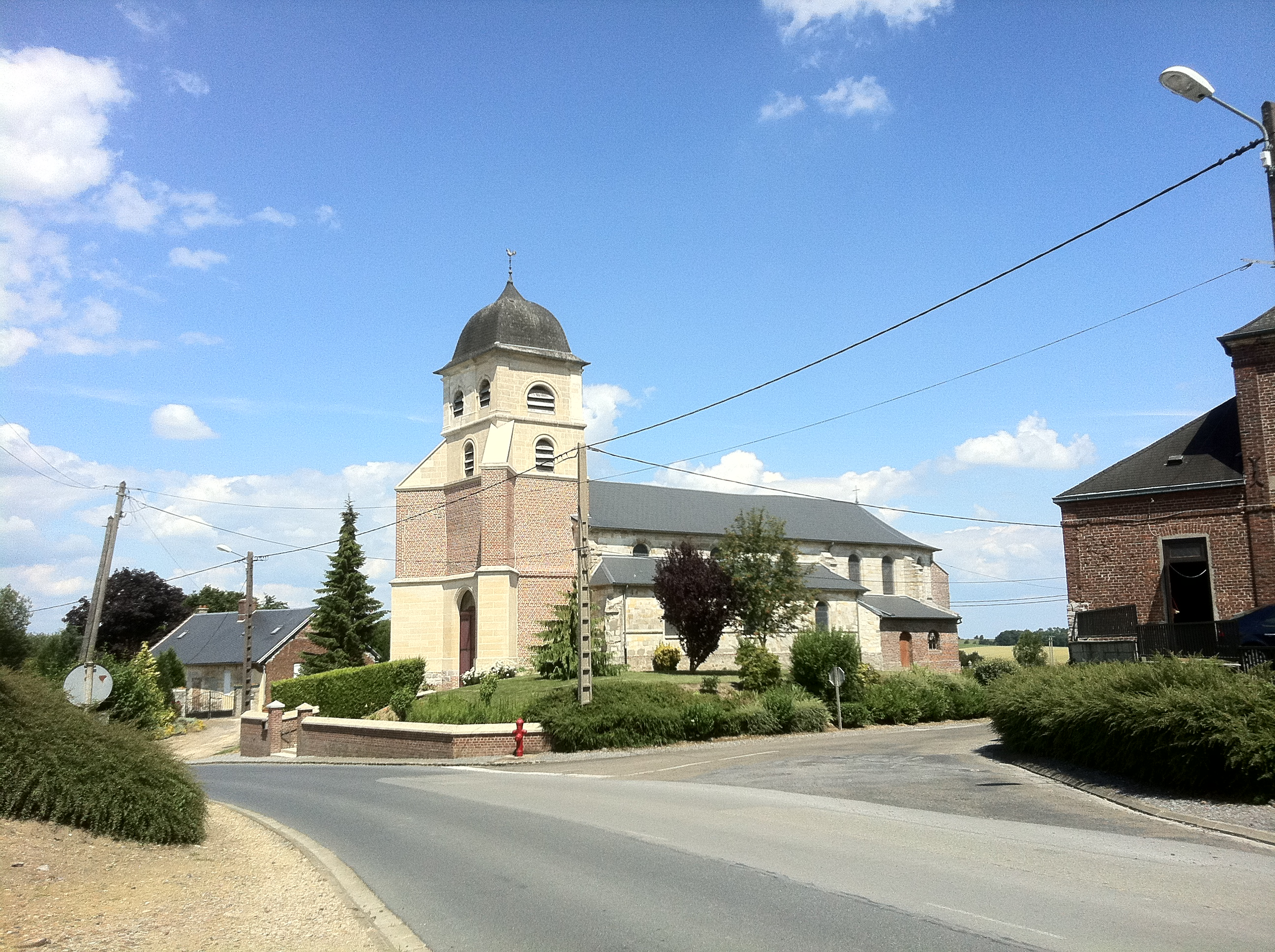
- The church of Grougis
- Location of Grougis
- Location within France Location within Hauts-de-France
- Coordinates: 49°56′38″N 3°31′58″E
- Country: France
- Region: Hauts-de-France
- Department: Aisne
- Arrondissement: Vervins
- Canton: Guise

Government
  - Mayor (2026–32): Yves Dumur
- Area^{1}: 11.26 km^{2} (4.35 sq mi)
- Elevation: 165 m (541 ft)
- Highest elevation: 178 m (584 ft)
- Lowest elevation: 120 m (390 ft)
- Population (2023): 304
  - Density: 27.0/km^{2} (69.9/sq mi)
- Time zone: UTC+01:00 (CET)
  - Summer (DST): UTC+02:00 (CEST)
- INSEE/Postal code: 02358 /02110
- ^{1} French Land Register data, which excludes lakes, ponds, glaciers > 1 km^{2} (0.386 sq mi or 247 acres) and river estuaries.

Grougis is a commune in the Aisne department in Hauts-de-France in northern France.

== Population ==
Historical population
Year	Pop.	±% p.a.
1968	420	—
1975	361	−2.14%
1982	340	−0.85%
1990	320	−0.75%
1999	350	+1.00%
2007	362	+0.42%
2012	387	+1.34%
2017	358	−1.55%
2023	304	−2.69%
Source: INSEE

== See also ==
- Communes of the Aisne department
