= La Vallée-Mulâtre =

- Commune
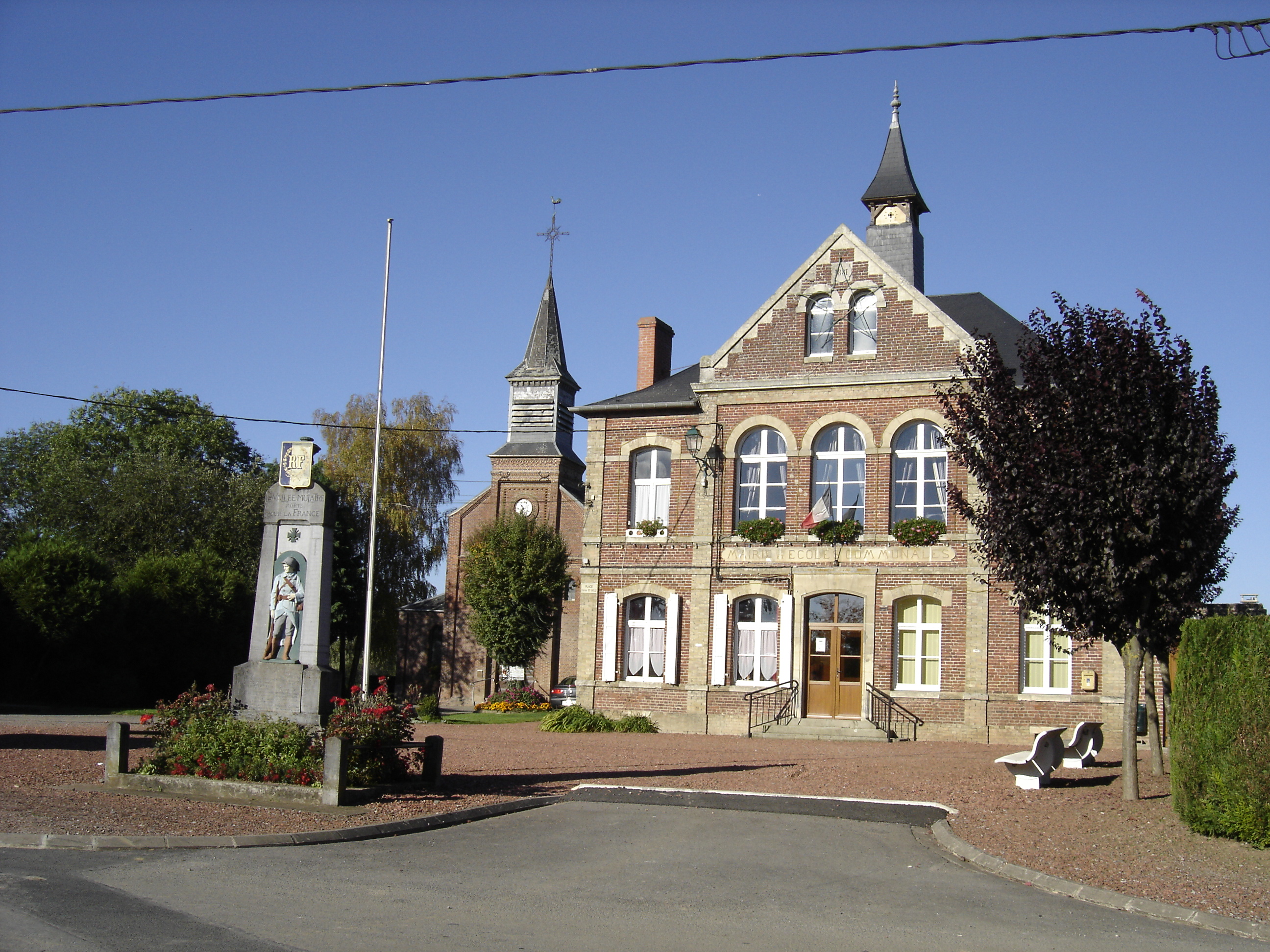
- Town hall
- Location of La Vallée-Mulâtre
- Location within France Location within Hauts-de-France
- Coordinates: 50°01′19″N 3°33′37″E
- Country: France
- Region: Hauts-de-France
- Department: Aisne
- Arrondissement: Vervins
- Canton: Guise

Government
  - Mayor (2026–32): Jean-Pierre Degardez
- Area^{1}: 5.28 km^{2} (2.04 sq mi)
- Elevation: 150 m (490 ft)
- Highest elevation: 161 m (528 ft)
- Lowest elevation: 123 m (404 ft)
- Population (2023): 152
  - Density: 28.8/km^{2} (74.6/sq mi)
- Time zone: UTC+01:00 (CET)
  - Summer (DST): UTC+02:00 (CEST)
- INSEE/Postal code: 02760 /02110
- ^{1} French Land Register data, which excludes lakes, ponds, glaciers > 1 km^{2} (0.386 sq mi or 247 acres) and river estuaries.

La Vallée-Mulâtre (French pronunciation: [la vale mylatʁ]) is a commune in the Aisne department in Hauts-de-France in northern France.

== Population ==
Historical population
Year	Pop.	±% p.a.
1968	204	—
1975	182	−1.62%
1982	148	−2.91%
1990	148	+0.00%
1999	145	−0.23%
2007	141	−0.35%
2012	160	+2.56%
2017	148	−1.55%
2023	152	+0.45%
Source: INSEE

== See also ==
- Communes of the Aisne department
