= Dorengt =

- Commune
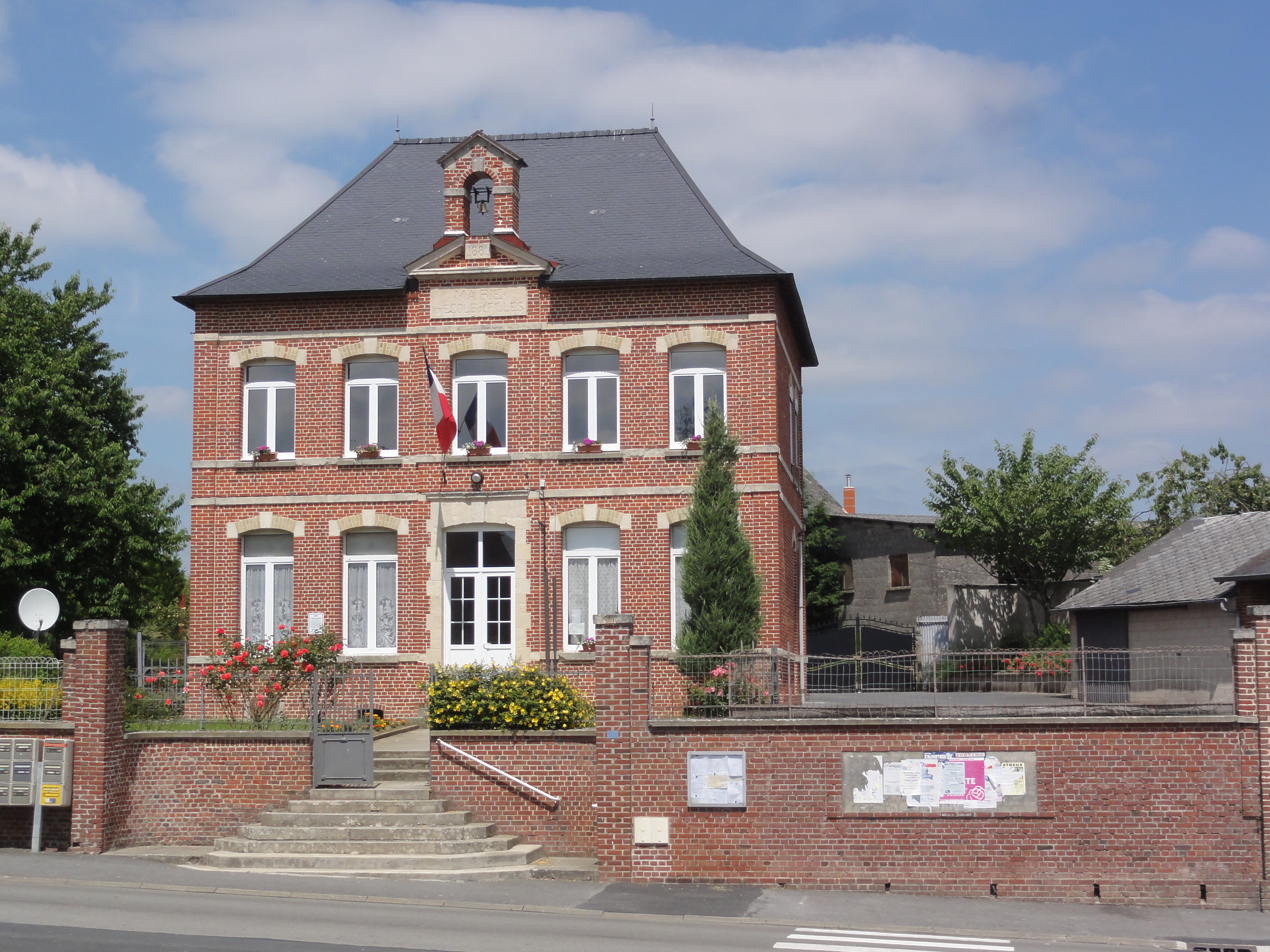
- The town hall of Dorengt
- Location of Dorengt
- Location within France Location within Hauts-de-France
- Coordinates: 49°58′32″N 3°41′06″E
- Country: France
- Region: Hauts-de-France
- Department: Aisne
- Arrondissement: Vervins
- Canton: Guise
- Intercommunality: Thiérache du Centre

Government
  - Mayor (2026–32): Olivier Cambraye
- Area^{1}: 10.5 km^{2} (4.1 sq mi)
- Elevation: 50 m (160 ft)
- Highest elevation: 178 m (584 ft)
- Lowest elevation: 132 m (433 ft)
- Population (2023): 148
  - Density: 14.1/km^{2} (36.5/sq mi)
- Time zone: UTC+01:00 (CET)
  - Summer (DST): UTC+02:00 (CEST)
- INSEE/Postal code: 02269 /02450
- ^{1} French Land Register data, which excludes lakes, ponds, glaciers > 1 km^{2} (0.386 sq mi or 247 acres) and river estuaries.

Dorengt (French pronunciation: [dɔʁɑ̃]) is a commune in the Aisne department in Hauts-de-France in northern France.

== Population ==
Historical population
Year	Pop.	±% p.a.
1968	230	—
1975	202	−1.84%
1982	183	−1.40%
1990	171	−0.84%
1999	142	−2.04%
2007	151	+0.77%
2012	156	+0.65%
2017	154	−0.26%
2023	148	−0.66%
Source: INSEE

== See also ==
- Communes of the Aisne department
