= Saint-Martin-Rivière =

- Commune
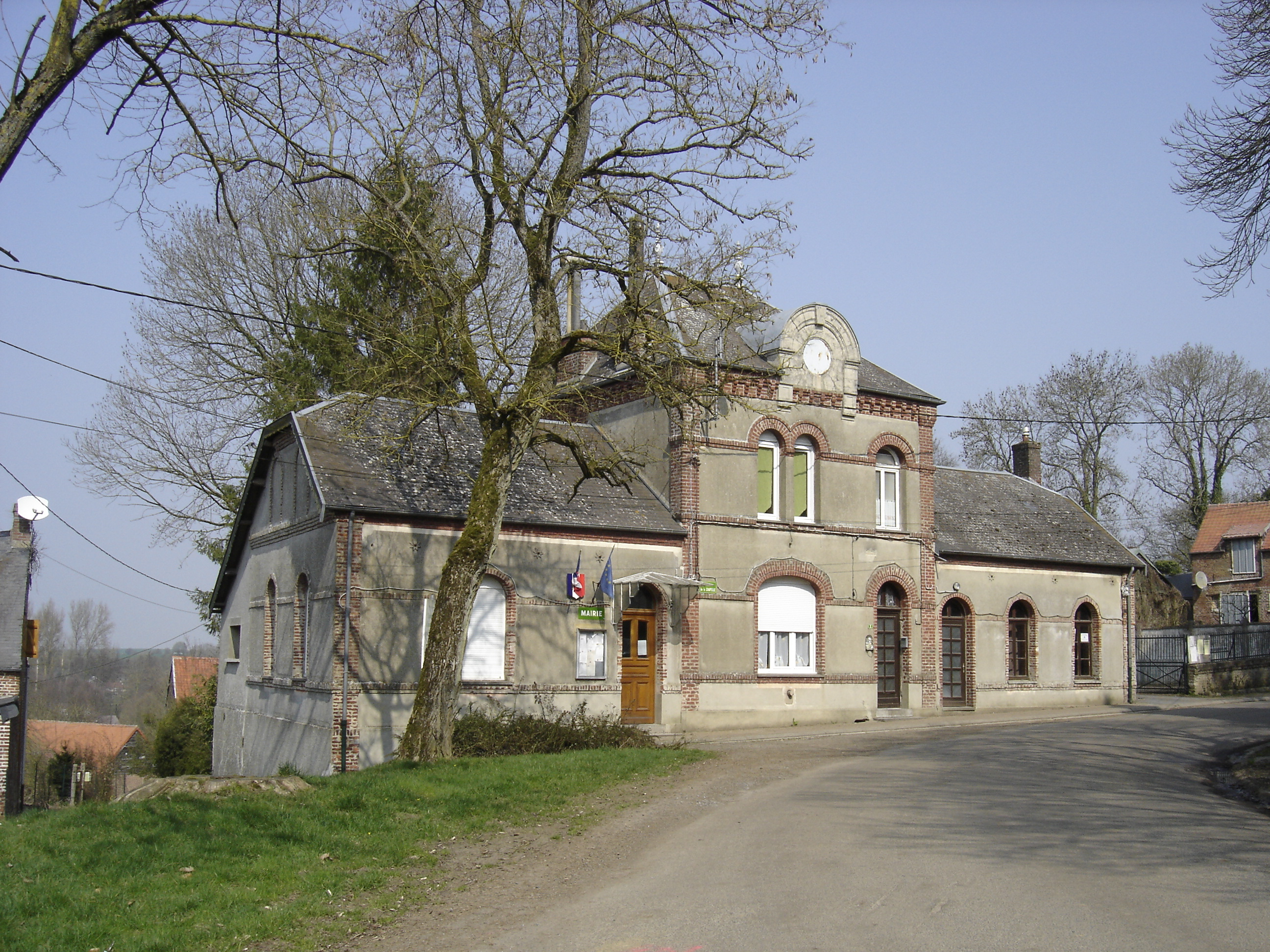
- The town hall of Saint-Martin-Rivière
- Location of Saint-Martin-Rivière
- Location within France Location within Hauts-de-France
- Coordinates: 50°02′39″N 3°32′26″E
- Country: France
- Region: Hauts-de-France
- Department: Aisne
- Arrondissement: Vervins
- Canton: Guise

Government
  - Mayor (2026–32): Étienne Plateau
- Area^{1}: 5.52 km^{2} (2.13 sq mi)
- Elevation: 100 m (330 ft)
- Highest elevation: 163 m (535 ft)
- Lowest elevation: 108 m (354 ft)
- Population (2023): 118
  - Density: 21.4/km^{2} (55.4/sq mi)
- Time zone: UTC+01:00 (CET)
  - Summer (DST): UTC+02:00 (CEST)
- INSEE/Postal code: 02683 /02110
- ^{1} French Land Register data, which excludes lakes, ponds, glaciers > 1 km^{2} (0.386 sq mi or 247 acres) and river estuaries.

Saint-Martin-Rivière (French pronunciation: [sɛ̃ maʁtɛ̃ ʁivjɛʁ]) is a commune in the Aisne department in Hauts-de-France in northern France.

== Population ==
Historical population
Year	Pop.	±% p.a.
1968	150	—
1975	151	+0.09%
1982	129	−2.22%
1990	108	−2.20%
1999	119	+1.08%
2007	118	−0.11%
2012	133	+2.42%
2017	115	−2.87%
2023	118	+0.43%
Source: INSEE

== See also ==
- Communes of the Aisne department
