= Oisy, Aisne =

Oisy
- Commune
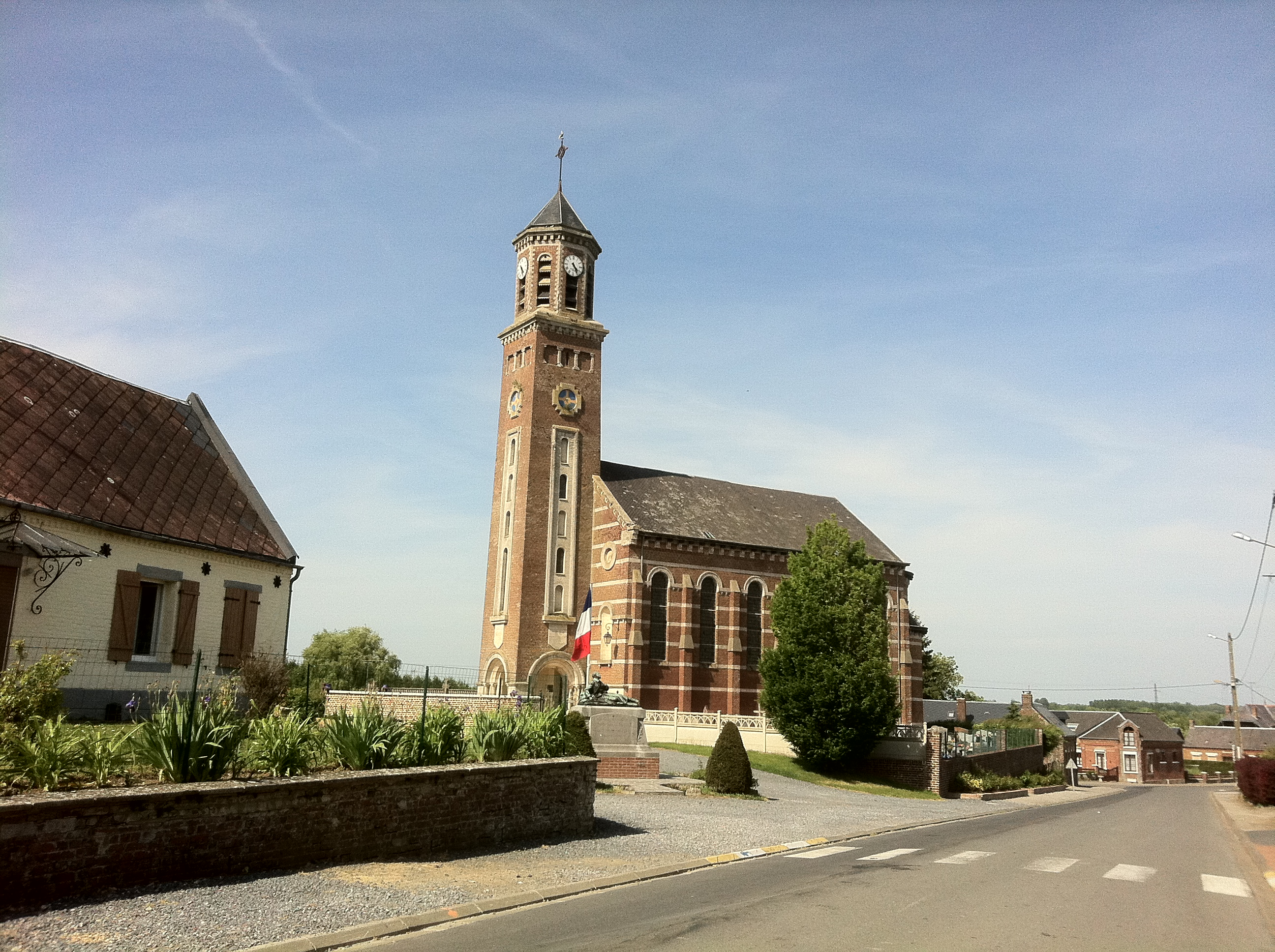
- The church of Oisy
- Location of Oisy
- Location within France Location within Hauts-de-France
- Coordinates: 50°01′18″N 3°40′12″E
- Country: France
- Region: Hauts-de-France
- Department: Aisne
- Arrondissement: Vervins
- Canton: Guise
- Intercommunality: Thiérache Sambre et Oise

Government
  - Mayor (2026–32): Jean-Louis Dufrenne
- Area^{1}: 10.79 km^{2} (4.17 sq mi)
- Elevation: 154 m (505 ft)
- Highest elevation: 161 m (528 ft)
- Lowest elevation: 137 m (449 ft)
- Population (2023): 438
  - Density: 40.6/km^{2} (105/sq mi)
- Time zone: UTC+01:00 (CET)
  - Summer (DST): UTC+02:00 (CEST)
- INSEE/Postal code: 02569 /02450
- ^{1} French Land Register data, which excludes lakes, ponds, glaciers > 1 km^{2} (0.386 sq mi or 247 acres) and river estuaries.

Oisy (French pronunciation: [wazi]) is a commune in the Aisne department in Hauts-de-France in northern France.

== Population ==
Historical population
Year	Pop.	±% p.a.
1968	508	—
1975	502	−0.17%
1982	505	+0.09%
1990	473	−0.81%
1999	416	−1.42%
2007	411	−0.15%
2012	447	+1.69%
2017	466	+0.84%
2023	438	−1.03%
Source: INSEE

== See also ==
- Communes of the Aisne department
