= Canton of Guise =

Coordinates: 49°54′N 3°37′E

Guise
- Canton
- Interactive map of Guise
- Country: France
- Region: Hauts-de-France
- Department: Aisne
- No. of communes: {{{nbcomm}}}
- Area: 468.52 km^{2} (180.90 sq mi)
- Population (2023): 22,738
  - Density: 48.532/km^{2} (125.70/sq mi)
- INSEE code: 02 07

The canton of Guise is an administrative division in northern France. At the French canton reorganisation which came into effect in March 2015, the canton was expanded from 19 to 45 communes:

1. Aisonville-et-Bernoville
2. Audigny
3. Barzy-en-Thiérache
4. Bergues-sur-Sambre
5. Bernot
6. Boué
7. Chigny
8. Crupilly
9. Dorengt
10. Esquéhéries
11. Étreux
12. Fesmy-le-Sart
13. Flavigny-le-Grand-et-Beaurain
14. Grand-Verly
15. Grougis
16. Guise
17. Hannapes
18. Hauteville
19. Iron
20. Lavaqueresse
21. Leschelle
22. Lesquielles-Saint-Germain
23. Macquigny
24. Malzy
25. Marly-Gomont
26. Mennevret
27. Molain
28. Monceau-sur-Oise
29. La Neuville-lès-Dorengt
30. Le Nouvion-en-Thiérache
31. Noyales
32. Oisy
33. Petit-Verly
34. Proisy
35. Proix
36. Ribeauville
37. Romery
38. Saint-Martin-Rivière
39. Tupigny
40. Vadencourt
41. La Vallée-Mulâtre
42. Vaux-Andigny
43. Vénérolles
44. Villers-lès-Guise
45. Wassigny

== Demographics ==
Historical population
Year	Pop.	±% p.a.
2013	24,232	—
2018	23,349	−0.74%
Source: INSEE

== See also ==
- Cantons of the Aisne department
- Communes of France
