= Cantons of the Aisne department =

The following is a list of the 21 cantons of the Aisne department, in France, following the French canton reorganisation which came into effect in March 2015:

- Bohain-en-Vermandois
- Château-Thierry
- Chauny
- Essômes-sur-Marne
- Fère-en-Tardenois
- Guise
- Hirson
- Laon-1
- Laon-2
- Marle
- Ribemont
- Saint-Quentin-1
- Saint-Quentin-2
- Saint-Quentin-3
- Soissons-1
- Soissons-2
- Tergnier
- Vervins
- Vic-sur-Aisne
- Villeneuve-sur-Aisne
- Villers-Cotterêts
