= Grand-Verly =

- Commune
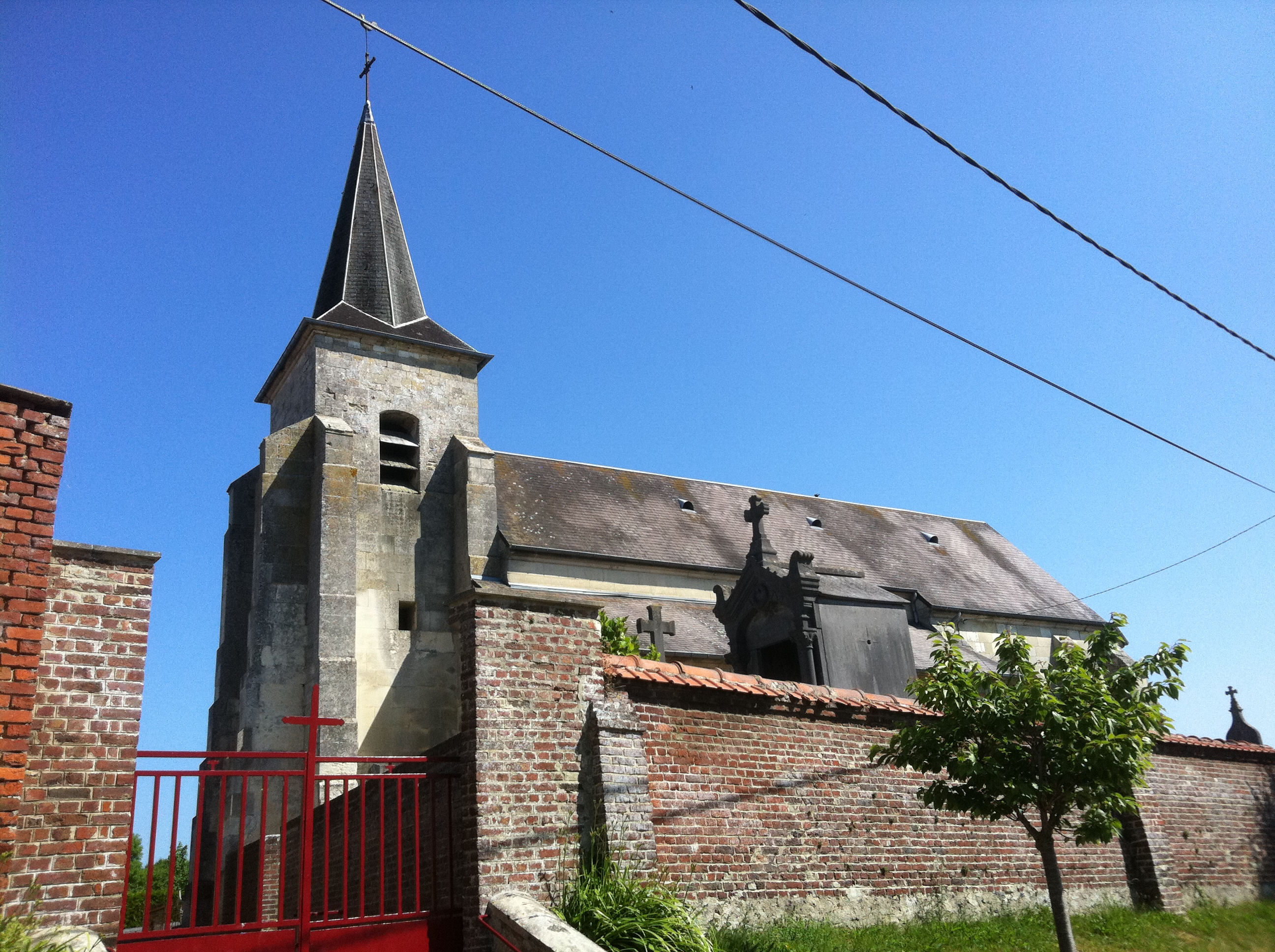
- The church of Grand-Verly
- Location of Grand-Verly
- Location within France Location within Hauts-de-France
- Coordinates: 49°56′19″N 3°35′06″E
- Country: France
- Region: Hauts-de-France
- Department: Aisne
- Arrondissement: Vervins
- Canton: Guise

Government
  - Mayor (2026–32): Hervé Flamant
- Area^{1}: 3.8 km^{2} (1.5 sq mi)
- Elevation: 135 m (443 ft)
- Highest elevation: 153 m (502 ft)
- Lowest elevation: 87 m (285 ft)
- Population (2023): 124
  - Density: 33/km^{2} (85/sq mi)
- Time zone: UTC+01:00 (CET)
  - Summer (DST): UTC+02:00 (CEST)
- INSEE/Postal code: 02783 /02120
- ^{1} French Land Register data, which excludes lakes, ponds, glaciers > 1 km^{2} (0.386 sq mi or 247 acres) and river estuaries.

Grand-Verly (French pronunciation: [ɡʁɑ̃ vɛʁli]) is a commune in the Aisne department in Hauts-de-France in northern France.

== Population ==
Historical population
Year	Pop.	±% p.a.
1968	187	—
1975	125	−5.59%
1982	131	+0.67%
1990	136	+0.47%
1999	137	+0.08%
2007	137	+0.00%
2012	149	+1.69%
2017	138	−1.52%
2023	124	−1.77%
Source: INSEE

== See also ==
- Communes of the Aisne department
