= Petit-Verly =

- Commune
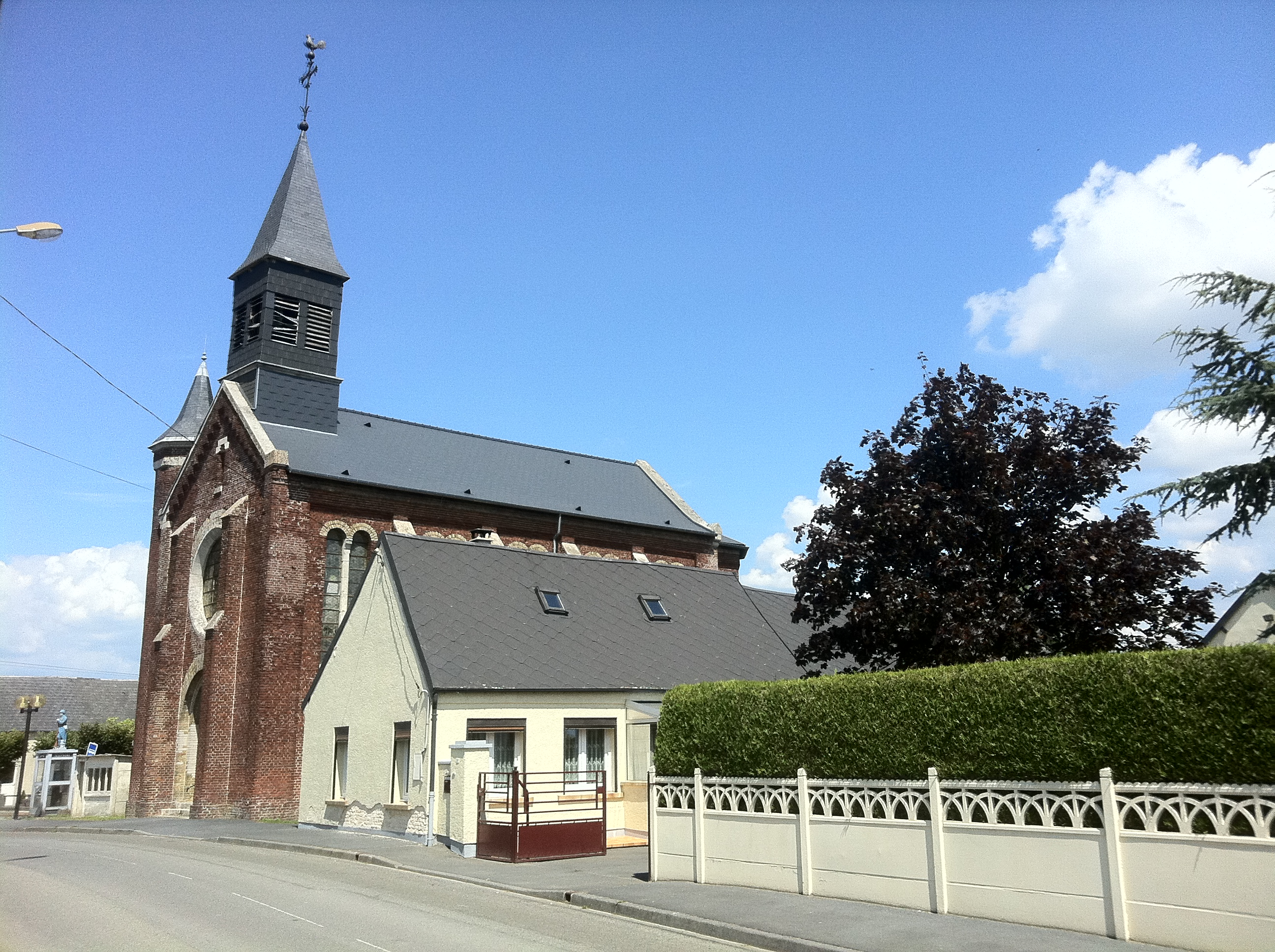
- The church of Petit-Verly

- Coat of arms
- Location of Petit-Verly
- Location within France Location within Hauts-de-France
- Coordinates: 49°58′22″N 3°33′28″E
- Country: France
- Region: Hauts-de-France
- Department: Aisne
- Arrondissement: Vervins
- Canton: Guise

Government
  - Mayor (2026–32): Pascal Druaux
- Area^{1}: 5.19 km^{2} (2.00 sq mi)
- Elevation: 150 m (490 ft)
- Highest elevation: 177 m (581 ft)
- Lowest elevation: 120 m (390 ft)
- Population (2023): 155
  - Density: 29.9/km^{2} (77.4/sq mi)
- Time zone: UTC+01:00 (CET)
  - Summer (DST): UTC+02:00 (CEST)
- INSEE/Postal code: 02784 /02630
- ^{1} French Land Register data, which excludes lakes, ponds, glaciers > 1 km^{2} (0.386 sq mi or 247 acres) and river estuaries.

Petit-Verly (French pronunciation: [pəti vɛʁli]) is a commune in the Aisne department in Hauts-de-France in northern France.

== Population ==
Historical population
Year	Pop.	±% p.a.
1968	199	—
1975	166	−2.56%
1982	153	−1.16%
1990	150	−0.25%
1999	176	+1.79%
2007	199	+1.55%
2012	178	−2.21%
2017	149	−3.49%
2023	155	+0.66%
Source: INSEE

== See also ==
- Communes of the Aisne department
