= Canton of La Capelle =

Coordinates: 49°58′41″N 3°55′02″E

La Capelle
- Former canton
- Interactive map of La Capelle
- Country: France
- Region: Hauts-de-France
- Department: Aisne
- No. of communes: {{{nbcomm}}}
- Disbanded: 2015
- Area: 192.68 km^{2} (74.39 sq mi)
- Population (2012): 8,128
  - Density: 42.18/km^{2} (109.3/sq mi)

The canton of La Capelle is a former administrative division in northern France. It was disbanded following the French canton reorganisation which came into effect in March 2015. It had 8,128 inhabitants (2012).

The canton comprised the following communes:

- Buironfosse
- La Capelle
- Chigny
- Clairfontaine
- Crupilly
- Englancourt
- Erloy
- Étréaupont
- La Flamengrie
- Fontenelle
- Froidestrées
- Gergny
- Lerzy
- Luzoir
- Papleux
- Rocquigny
- Sommeron
- Sorbais

== See also ==
- List of cantons of France
