= Audigny =

- Commune
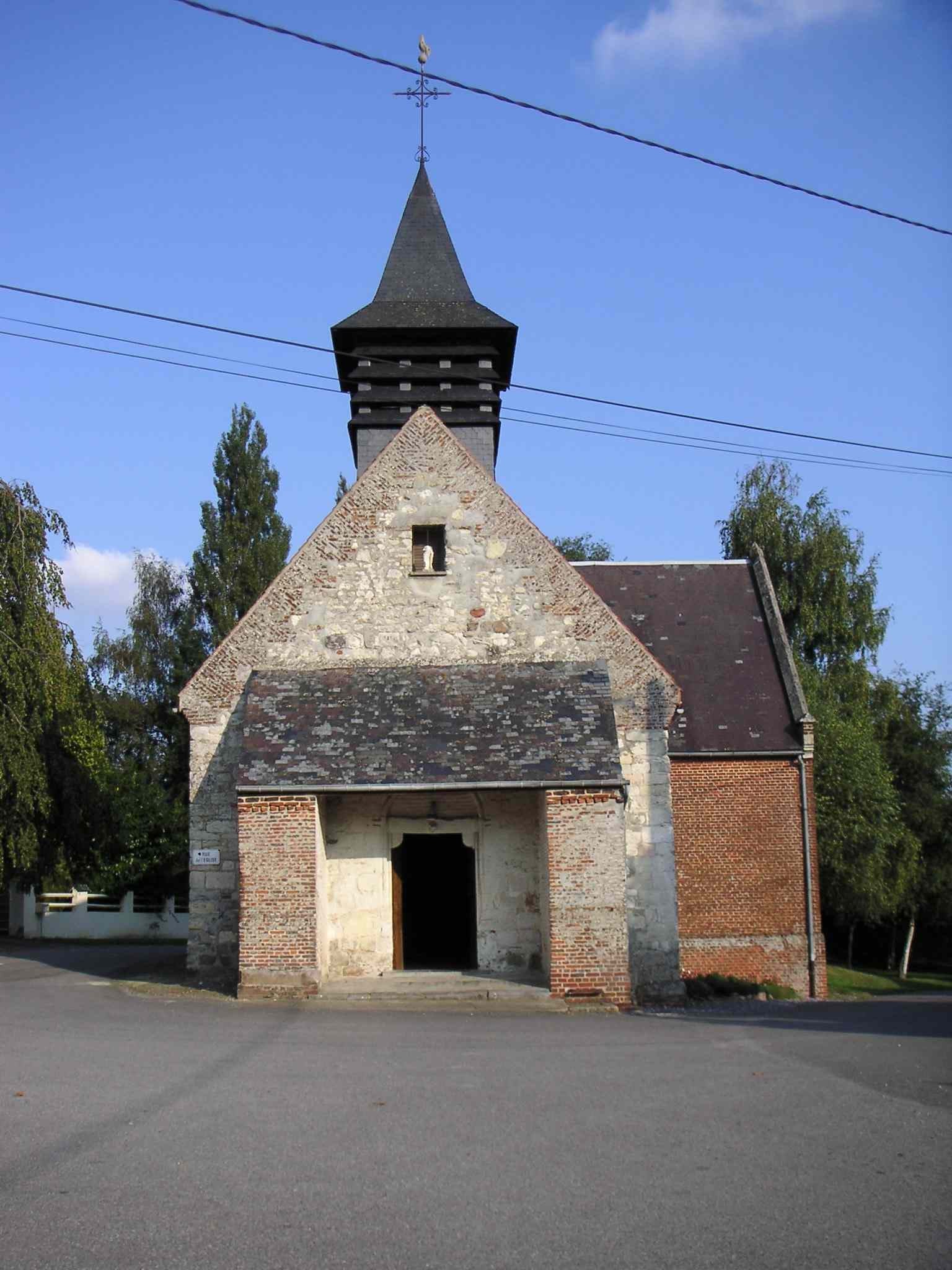
- Location of Audigny
- Location within France Location within Hauts-de-France
- Coordinates: 49°52′14″N 3°38′52″E
- Country: France
- Region: Hauts-de-France
- Department: Aisne
- Arrondissement: Vervins
- Canton: Guise
- Intercommunality: Thiérache Sambre et Oise

Government
  - Mayor (2026–32): Christophe Chretien
- Area^{1}: 10.73 km^{2} (4.14 sq mi)
- Elevation: 136 m (446 ft)
- Highest elevation: 158 m (518 ft)
- Lowest elevation: 112 m (367 ft)
- Population (2023): 273
  - Density: 25.4/km^{2} (65.9/sq mi)
- Time zone: UTC+01:00 (CET)
  - Summer (DST): UTC+02:00 (CEST)
- INSEE/Postal code: 02035 /02120
- ^{1} French Land Register data, which excludes lakes, ponds, glaciers > 1 km^{2} (0.386 sq mi or 247 acres) and river estuaries.

Audigny (French pronunciation: [odiɲi]) is a commune in the department of Aisne in the Hauts-de-France region of northern France.

== Geography ==
Audigny is located some 22 km east of Saint-Quentin and 35 km north of Laon. It can be accessed by the D946 highway from Guise in the north passing through the heart of commune and continuing to Le Hérie-la-Viéville in the south, but without passing through Audigny village. The village is reached on road D37 branching southeast off the D946 through the village and continuing southeast to Puisieux-et-Clanlieu. The D586 also passes through the west of the commune from north to southwest. The commune consists entirely of farmland with no other villages or hamlets.

There are no identifiable streams or rivers in the commune.

== History ==
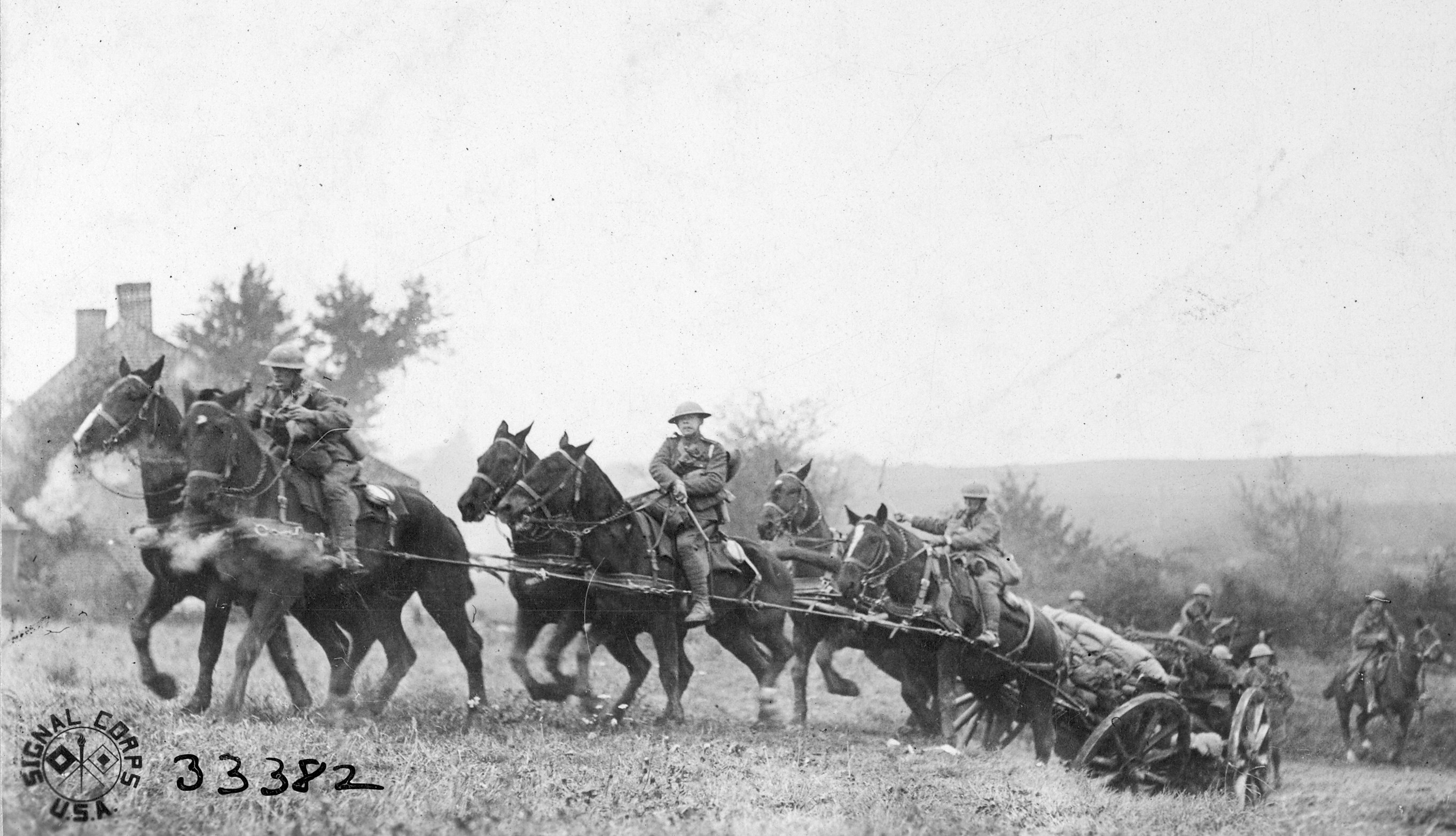
British field artillery at Audigny, 17 Oct 1918

Audigny was known as Aldiniacum in 1065, Aldinisia in 1161, Aldigni in 1165, and Auldigny in 1530. The name comes from a Germanic form of Aldinus derived from the Latin Albus meaning "White".

Albanus (Aldanus) was the name of a saint who lived near London at Verulanium in the 3rd century (now called Saint Albans). A soldier in the army of Diocletian, he returned home to England where he hosted a Christian missionary who was sought by local police. Converted in one night he gave his clothes to the missionary who managed to escape. Shortly after he was arrested for refusing to sacrifice to idols and he was immediately beheaded in 287. His fame and miracles arrived in France where many parishes adopted the saint as protector. His feast day is 22 June - the summer solstice.

The commune land in the 11th century belonged to various religious communities who venerated the saint and gave his name to the hamlet then the parish that was established in the area.

In 1918, after heavy fighting at Louvry's Farm, the village was liberated on 5 November 1918 at 6:30am by the 70th and 115th Infantry Battalions.

== Population ==
Historical population
Year	Pop.	±% p.a.
1968	326	—
1975	224	−5.22%
1982	193	−2.11%
1990	214	+1.30%
1999	207	−0.37%
2007	245	+2.13%
2012	283	+2.93%
2017	279	−0.28%
2023	273	−0.36%
Source: INSEE

== Sites and Monuments ==
- The Château de l'Étang (16th century) is registered as an historical monument.
- The Parish Church of Saint Peter and Saint Paul contains a number of items that are registered as historical objects:
  - An Altar Painting: The Resurrection of Christ (1835)
  - The main Altar, Tabernacle, and Retable (18th century)
  - A Restoration style Chair (19th century)
  - A Grotto of Lourdes with statues of the Virgin and Saint Bernadette Soubirous (19th century)
  - A pair of Stools (19th century)
  - A Cross: Christ on the Cross (18th century)
  - A Baptismal font (15th century)

== See also ==
- Communes of the Aisne department
