= Arrondissement of Vervins =

Coordinates: 49°49′N 3°54′E

Vervins
- Arrondissement
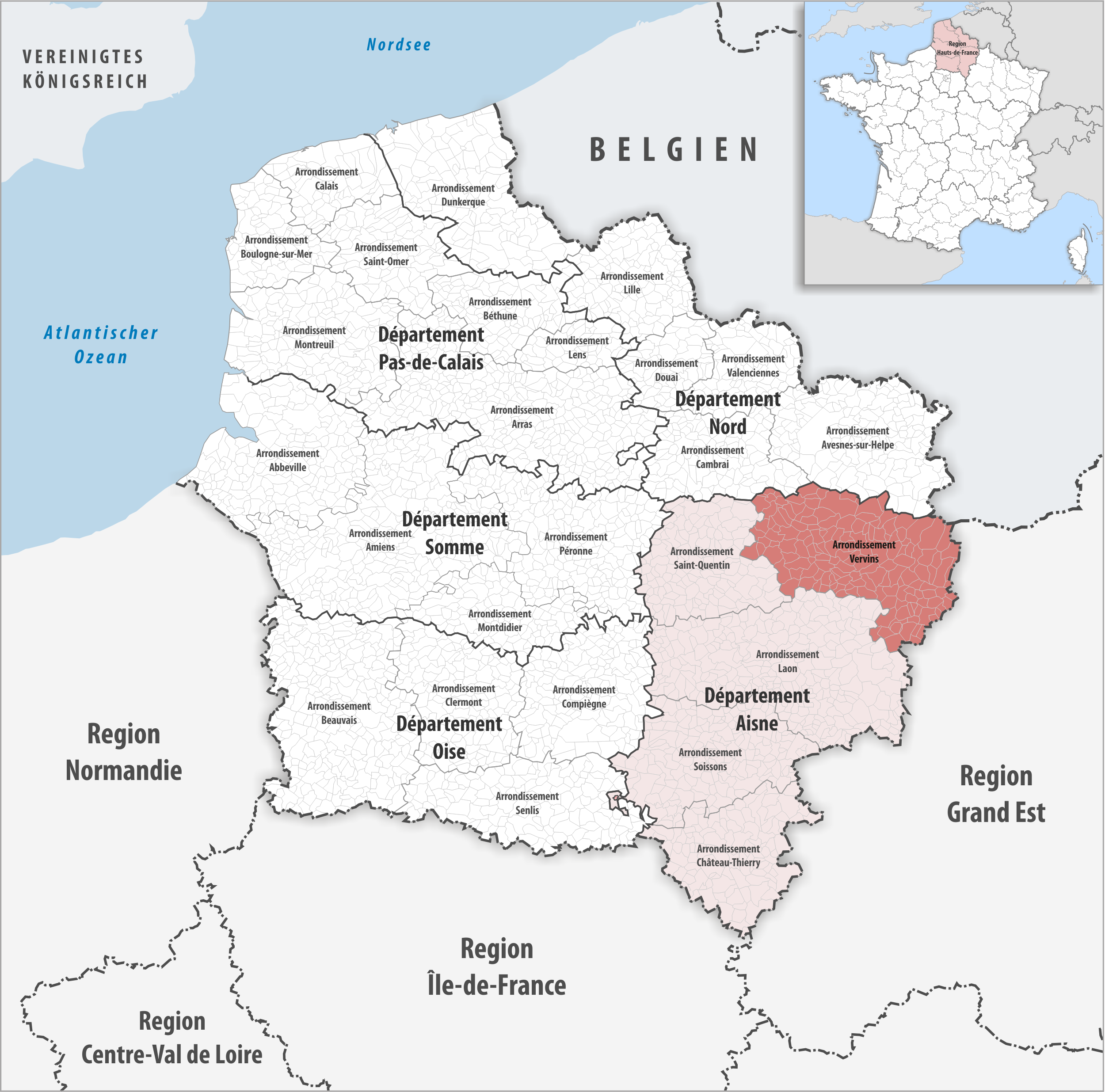
- Location within the region Hauts-de-France
- Country: France
- Region: Hauts-de-France
- Department: Aisne
- No. of communes: {{{nbcomm}}}
- Area: 1,657.8 km^{2} (640.1 sq mi)
- Population (2023): 68,815
  - Density: 41.510/km^{2} (107.51/sq mi)
- INSEE code: 025

The arrondissement of Vervins is an arrondissement of France in the Aisne department in the Hauts-de-France region. It has 160 communes. Its population is 69,956 (2021), and its area is 1,657.8 km^{2} (640.1 sq mi).

== Composition ==
The communes of the arrondissement of Vervins, and their INSEE codes, are:

1. Aisonville-et-Bernoville (02006)
2. Any-Martin-Rieux (02020)
3. Archon (02021)
4. Aubenton (02031)
5. Audigny (02035)
6. Les Autels (02038)
7. Autreppes (02040)
8. Bancigny (02044)
9. Barzy-en-Thiérache (02050)
10. Beaumé (02055)
11. Bergues-sur-Sambre (02067)
12. Berlancourt (02068)
13. Berlise (02069)
14. Bernot (02070)
15. Besmont (02079)
16. Boué (02103)
17. La Bouteille (02109)
18. Braye-en-Thiérache (02116)
19. Brunehamel (02126)
20. Bucilly (02130)
21. Buire (02134)
22. Buironfosse (02135)
23. Burelles (02136)
24. La Capelle (02141)
25. Chaourse (02160)
26. Chéry-lès-Rozoy (02181)
27. Chevennes (02182)
28. Chigny (02188)
29. Clairfontaine (02197)
30. Clermont-les-Fermes (02200)
31. Coingt (02204)
32. Colonfay (02206)
33. Crupilly (02244)
34. Cuiry-lès-Iviers (02251)
35. Dagny-Lambercy (02256)
36. Dizy-le-Gros (02264)
37. Dohis (02265)
38. Dolignon (02266)
39. Dorengt (02269)
40. Effry (02275)
41. Englancourt (02276)
42. Éparcy (02278)
43. Erloy (02284)
44. Esquéhéries (02286)
45. Étréaupont (02295)
46. Étreux (02298)
47. Fesmy-le-Sart (02308)
48. La Flamengrie (02312)
49. Flavigny-le-Grand-et-Beaurain (02313)
50. Fontaine-lès-Vervins (02321)
51. Fontenelle (02324)
52. Franqueville (02331)
53. Froidestrées (02337)
54. Gercy (02341)
55. Gergny (02342)
56. Grandrieux (02354)
57. Grand-Verly (02783)
58. Gronard (02357)
59. Grougis (02358)
60. Guise (02361)
61. Hannapes (02366)
62. Harcigny (02369)
63. Hary (02373)
64. Hauteville (02376)
65. Haution (02377)
66. La Hérie (02378)
67. Le Hérie-la-Viéville (02379)
68. Hirson (02381)
69. Houry (02384)
70. Housset (02385)
71. Iron (02386)
72. Iviers (02388)
73. Jeantes (02391)
74. Laigny (02401)
75. Landifay-et-Bertaignemont (02403)
76. Landouzy-la-Cour (02404)
77. Landouzy-la-Ville (02405)
78. Lavaqueresse (02414)
79. Lemé (02416)
80. Lerzy (02418)
81. Leschelle (02419)
82. Lesquielles-Saint-Germain (02422)
83. Leuze (02425)
84. Lislet (02433)
85. Logny-lès-Aubenton (02435)
86. Lugny (02444)
87. Luzoir (02445)
88. Macquigny (02450)
89. Malzy (02455)
90. Marfontaine (02463)
91. Marly-Gomont (02469)
92. Martigny (02470)
93. Mennevret (02476)
94. Molain (02488)
95. Monceau-le-Neuf-et-Faucouzy (02491)
96. Monceau-sur-Oise (02494)
97. Mondrepuis (02495)
98. Montcornet (02502)
99. Montloué (02519)
100. Mont-Saint-Jean (02522)
101. Morgny-en-Thiérache (02526)
102. Nampcelles-la-Cour (02535)
103. Neuve-Maison (02544)
104. La Neuville-Housset (02547)
105. La Neuville-lès-Dorengt (02548)
106. Noircourt (02556)
107. Le Nouvion-en-Thiérache (02558)
108. Noyales (02563)
109. Ohis (02567)
110. Oisy (02569)
111. Origny-en-Thiérache (02574)
112. Papleux (02584)
113. Parfondeval (02586)
114. Petit-Verly (02784)
115. Plomion (02608)
116. Prisces (02623)
117. Proisy (02624)
118. Proix (02625)
119. Puisieux-et-Clanlieu (02629)
120. Raillimont (02634)
121. Renneval (02641)
122. Résigny (02642)
123. Ribeauville (02647)
124. Rocquigny (02650)
125. Rogny (02652)
126. Romery (02654)
127. Rougeries (02657)
128. Rouvroy-sur-Serre (02660)
129. Rozoy-sur-Serre (02666)
130. Sains-Richaumont (02668)
131. Saint-Algis (02670)
132. Saint-Clément (02674)
133. Sainte-Geneviève (02678)
134. Saint-Gobert (02681)
135. Saint-Martin-Rivière (02683)
136. Saint-Michel (02684)
137. Saint-Pierre-lès-Franqueville (02688)
138. Soize (02723)
139. Sommeron (02725)
140. Sorbais (02728)
141. Le Sourd (02731)
142. Thenailles (02740)
143. Le Thuel (02743)
144. Tupigny (02753)
145. Vadencourt (02757)
146. La Vallée-au-Blé (02759)
147. La Vallée-Mulâtre (02760)
148. Vaux-Andigny (02769)
149. Vénérolles (02779)
150. Vervins (02789)
151. Vigneux-Hocquet (02801)
152. La Ville-aux-Bois-lès-Dizy (02802)
153. Villers-lès-Guise (02814)
154. Vincy-Reuil-et-Magny (02819)
155. Voharies (02823)
156. Voulpaix (02826)
157. Wassigny (02830)
158. Watigny (02831)
159. Wiège-Faty (02832)
160. Wimy (02833)

== History ==
The arrondissement of Vervins was created in 1800. At the January 2017 reorganization of the arrondissements of Aisne, it received 30 communes from the arrondissement of Laon.

As a result of the reorganisation of the cantons of France which came into effect in 2015, the borders of the cantons are no longer related to the borders of the arrondissements. The cantons of the arrondissement of Vervins were, as of January 2015:

1. Aubenton
2. La Capelle
3. Guise
4. Hirson
5. Le Nouvion-en-Thiérache
6. Sains-Richaumont
7. Vervins
8. Wassigny
