= Vigneux (disambiguation) =

Vigneux is the name or part of the name of three communes of France:

- Vigneux-de-Bretagne in the Loire-Atlantique département
- Vigneux-Hocquet in the Aisne département
- Vigneux-sur-Seine in the Essonne département
