= 02109 =

02109 may refer to:

- Downtown Boston, part of Boston, Massachusetts, US
- La Bouteille, a commune in the Aisne department, France
