= La Neuville-lès-Dorengt =

- Commune
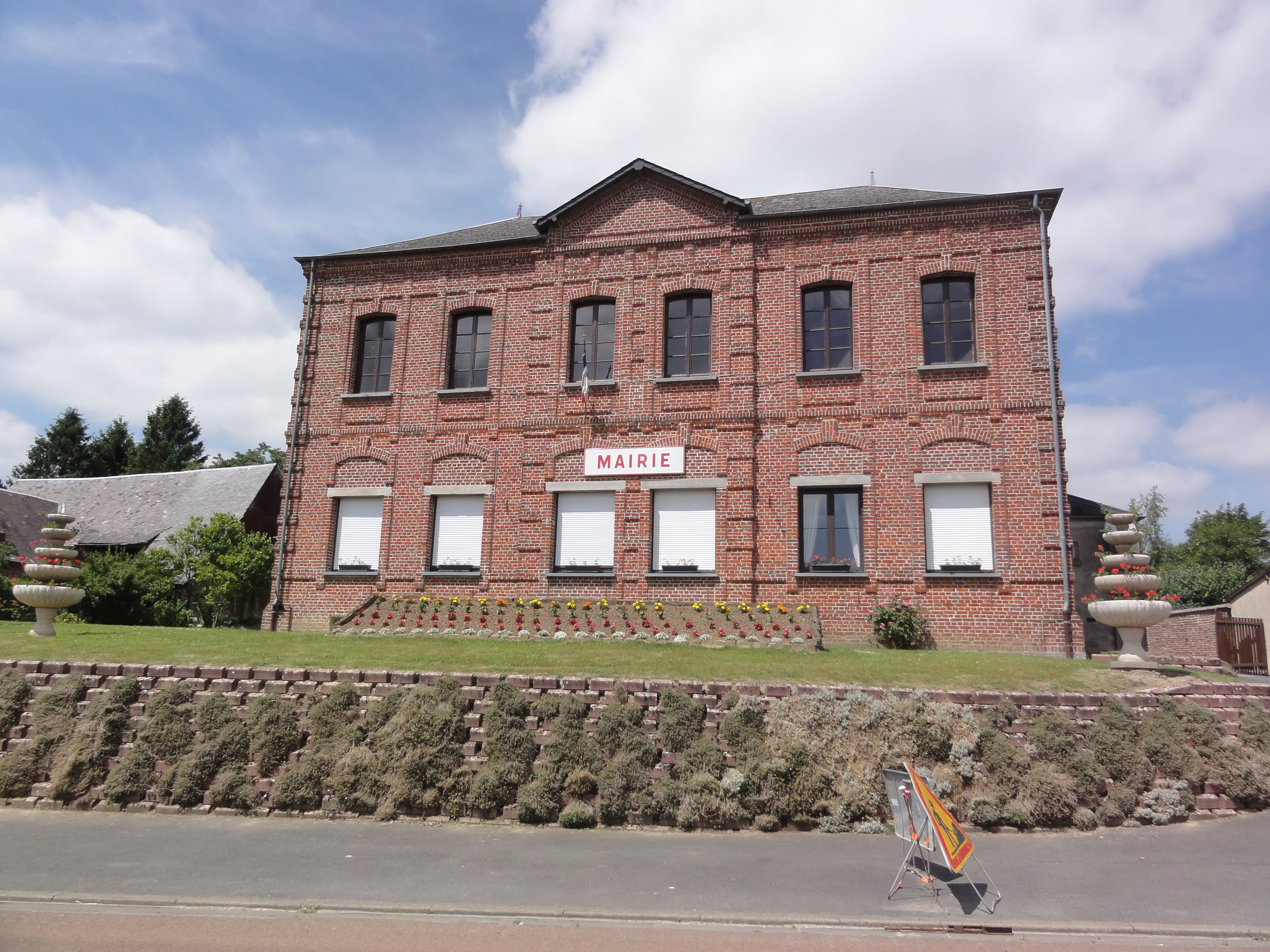
- The town hall of La Neuville-lès-Dorengt
- Location of La Neuville-lès-Dorengt
- Location within France Location within Hauts-de-France
- Coordinates: 49°58′41″N 3°40′34″E
- Country: France
- Region: Hauts-de-France
- Department: Aisne
- Arrondissement: Vervins
- Canton: Guise
- Intercommunality: Thiérache du Centre

Government
  - Mayor (2026–32): Mélanie Caron
- Area^{1}: 10.88 km^{2} (4.20 sq mi)
- Elevation: 162 m (531 ft)
- Highest elevation: 176 m (577 ft)
- Lowest elevation: 124 m (407 ft)
- Population (2023): 394
  - Density: 36.2/km^{2} (93.8/sq mi)
- Time zone: UTC+01:00 (CET)
  - Summer (DST): UTC+02:00 (CEST)
- INSEE/Postal code: 02548 /02450
- ^{1} French Land Register data, which excludes lakes, ponds, glaciers > 1 km^{2} (0.386 sq mi or 247 acres) and river estuaries.

La Neuville-lès-Dorengt (French pronunciation: [la nøvil lɛ dɔʁɑ̃], literally La Neuville near Dorengt) is a commune in the Aisne department in Hauts-de-France in northern France.

== Population ==
Historical population
Year	Pop.	±% p.a.
1968	414	—
1975	383	−1.11%
1982	381	−0.07%
1990	359	−0.74%
1999	348	−0.35%
2007	376	+0.97%
2012	397	+1.09%
2017	380	−0.87%
2023	394	+0.60%
Source: INSEE

== See also ==
- Communes of the Aisne department
