= La Ville-aux-Bois-lès-Dizy =

- Commune
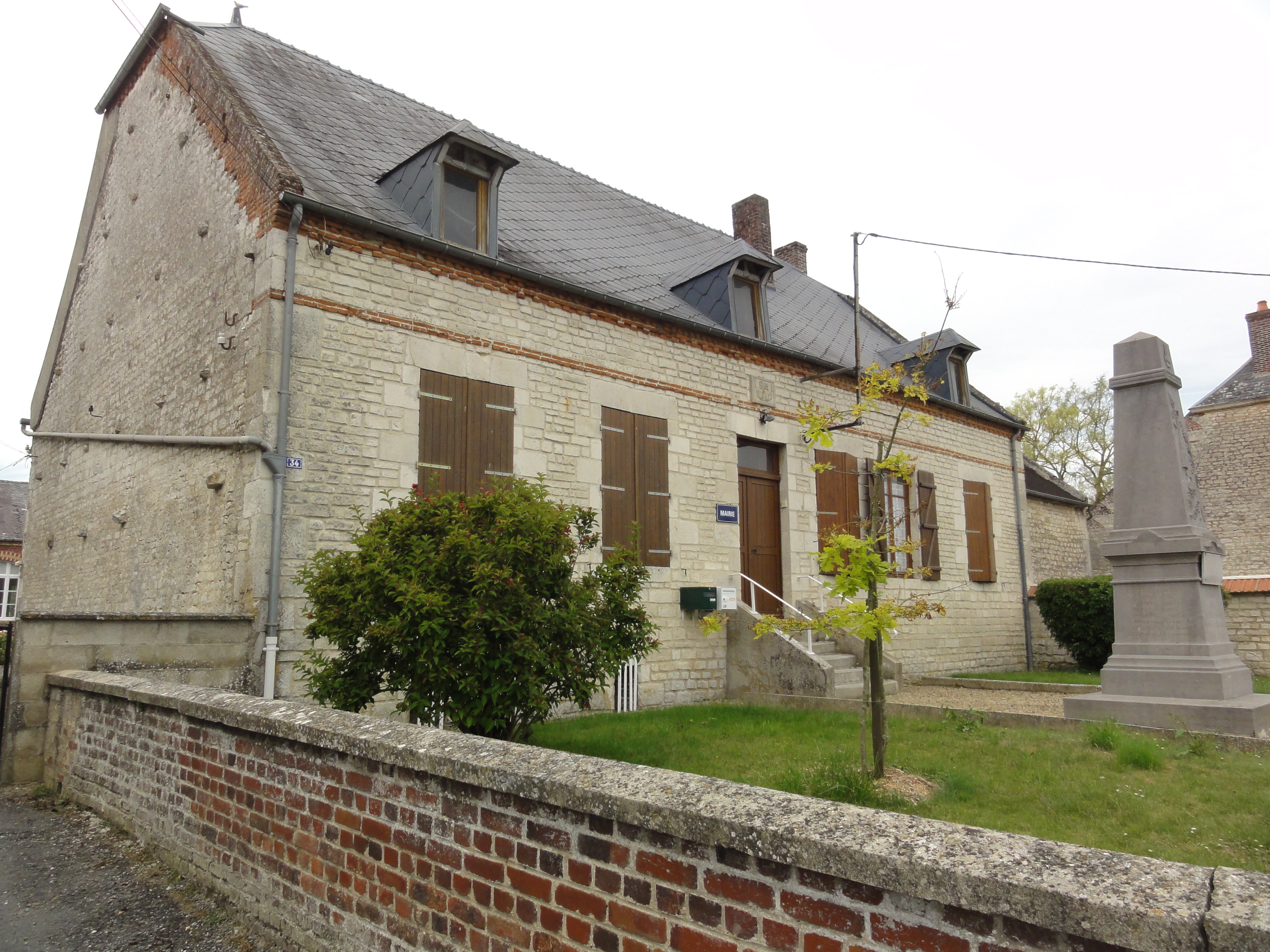
- The town hall of La Ville-aux-Bois-lès-Dizy
- Location of La Ville-aux-Bois-lès-Dizy
- Location within France Location within Hauts-de-France
- Coordinates: 49°39′42″N 3°59′38″E
- Country: France
- Region: Hauts-de-France
- Department: Aisne
- Arrondissement: Vervins
- Canton: Vervins
- Intercommunality: Portes de la Thiérache

Government
  - Mayor (2026–32): Mickaël Gerlot
- Area^{1}: 10.22 km^{2} (3.95 sq mi)
- Elevation: 147 m (482 ft)
- Highest elevation: 149 m (489 ft)
- Lowest elevation: 115 m (377 ft)
- Population (2023): 204
  - Density: 20.0/km^{2} (51.7/sq mi)
- Time zone: UTC+01:00 (CET)
  - Summer (DST): UTC+02:00 (CEST)
- INSEE/Postal code: 02802 /02340
- ^{1} French Land Register data, which excludes lakes, ponds, glaciers > 1 km^{2} (0.386 sq mi or 247 acres) and river estuaries.

La Ville-aux-Bois-lès-Dizy (French pronunciation: [la vil o bwa lɛ dizi], literally La Ville-aux-Bois near Dizy) is a commune in the Aisne department in Hauts-de-France in northern France.

== Population ==
Historical population
Year	Pop.	±% p.a.
1968	300	—
1975	229	−3.78%
1982	204	−1.64%
1990	210	+0.36%
1999	205	−0.27%
2007	195	−0.62%
2012	176	−2.03%
2017	207	+3.30%
2023	204	−0.24%
Source: INSEE

== See also ==
- Communes of the Aisne department
