= Wiège-Faty =

- Commune
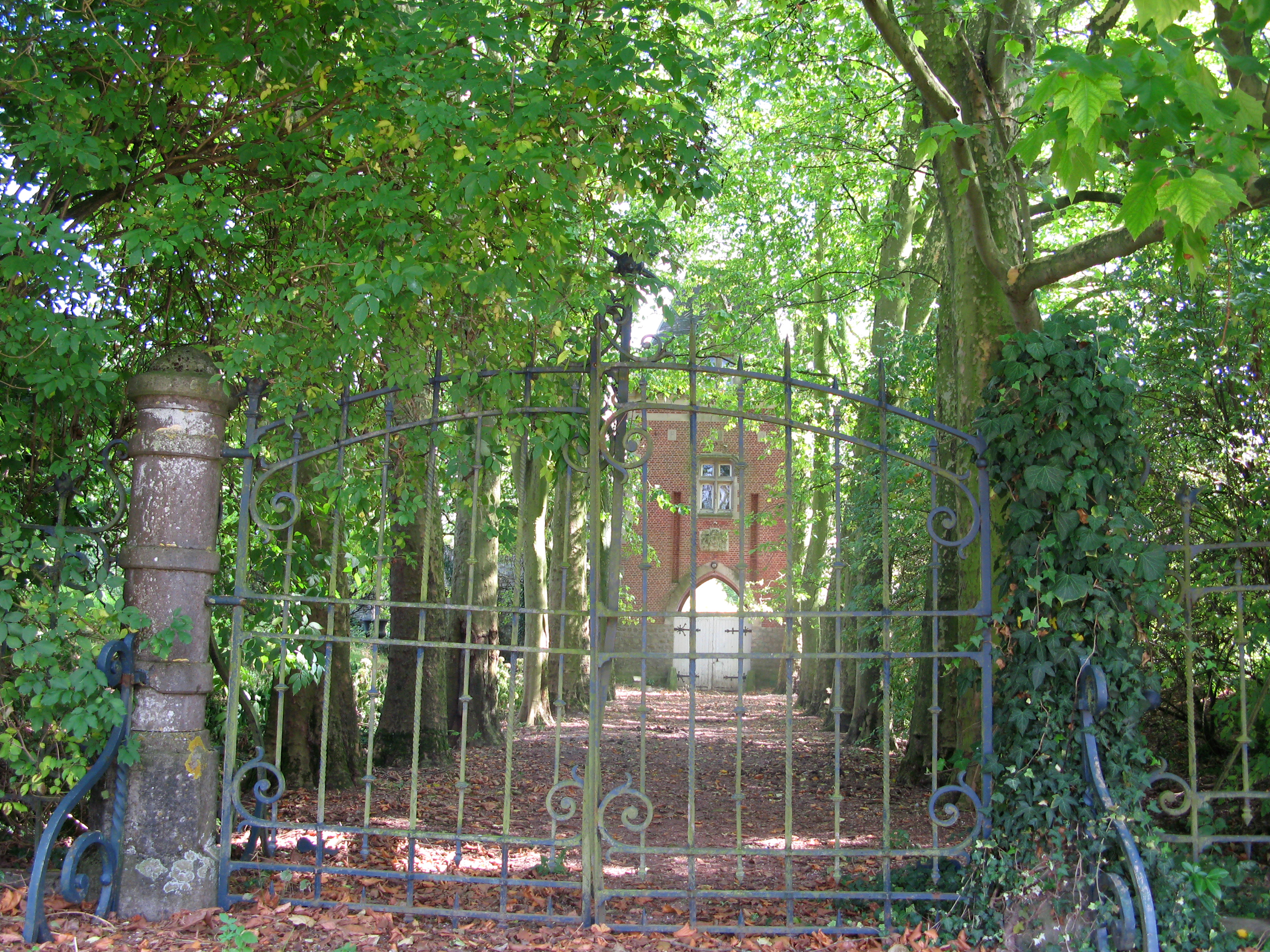
- Chateau of Wiège-Faty
- Location of Wiège-Faty
- Location within France Location within Hauts-de-France
- Coordinates: 49°52′56″N 3°43′11″E
- Country: France
- Region: Hauts-de-France
- Department: Aisne
- Arrondissement: Vervins
- Canton: Marle
- Intercommunality: Thiérache du Centre

Government
  - Mayor (2026–32): Marc Cotret
- Area^{1}: 7.47 km^{2} (2.88 sq mi)
- Elevation: 138 m (453 ft)
- Highest elevation: 164 m (538 ft)
- Lowest elevation: 101 m (331 ft)
- Population (2023): 179
  - Density: 24.0/km^{2} (62.1/sq mi)
- Time zone: UTC+01:00 (CET)
  - Summer (DST): UTC+02:00 (CEST)
- INSEE/Postal code: 02832 /02120
- ^{1} French Land Register data, which excludes lakes, ponds, glaciers > 1 km^{2} (0.386 sq mi or 247 acres) and river estuaries.

Wiège-Faty is a commune in the Aisne department in Hauts-de-France in northern France.

The castle from the 15th century was acquired, during the siege of Guise, from René de Bar by John II, Count of Ligny, supporter of the Burgundians, who besieged the fortress and captured it after three weeks. A few years later, Joan of Arc was imprisoned there: an engraved stone found in the 19th century recalls the event. During the Revolution, the castle became the property of Joseph Godard, who married his daughter, a cousin of Camille Desmoulins, to Beaubouchez.

== Population ==
Historical population
Year	Pop.	±% p.a.
1968	292	—
1975	214	−4.34%
1982	206	−0.54%
1990	180	−1.67%
1999	200	+1.18%
2007	225	+1.48%
2012	222	−0.27%
2017	200	−2.07%
2023	179	−1.83%
Source: INSEE

== See also ==
- Communes of the Aisne department
