= Boué =

- Commune
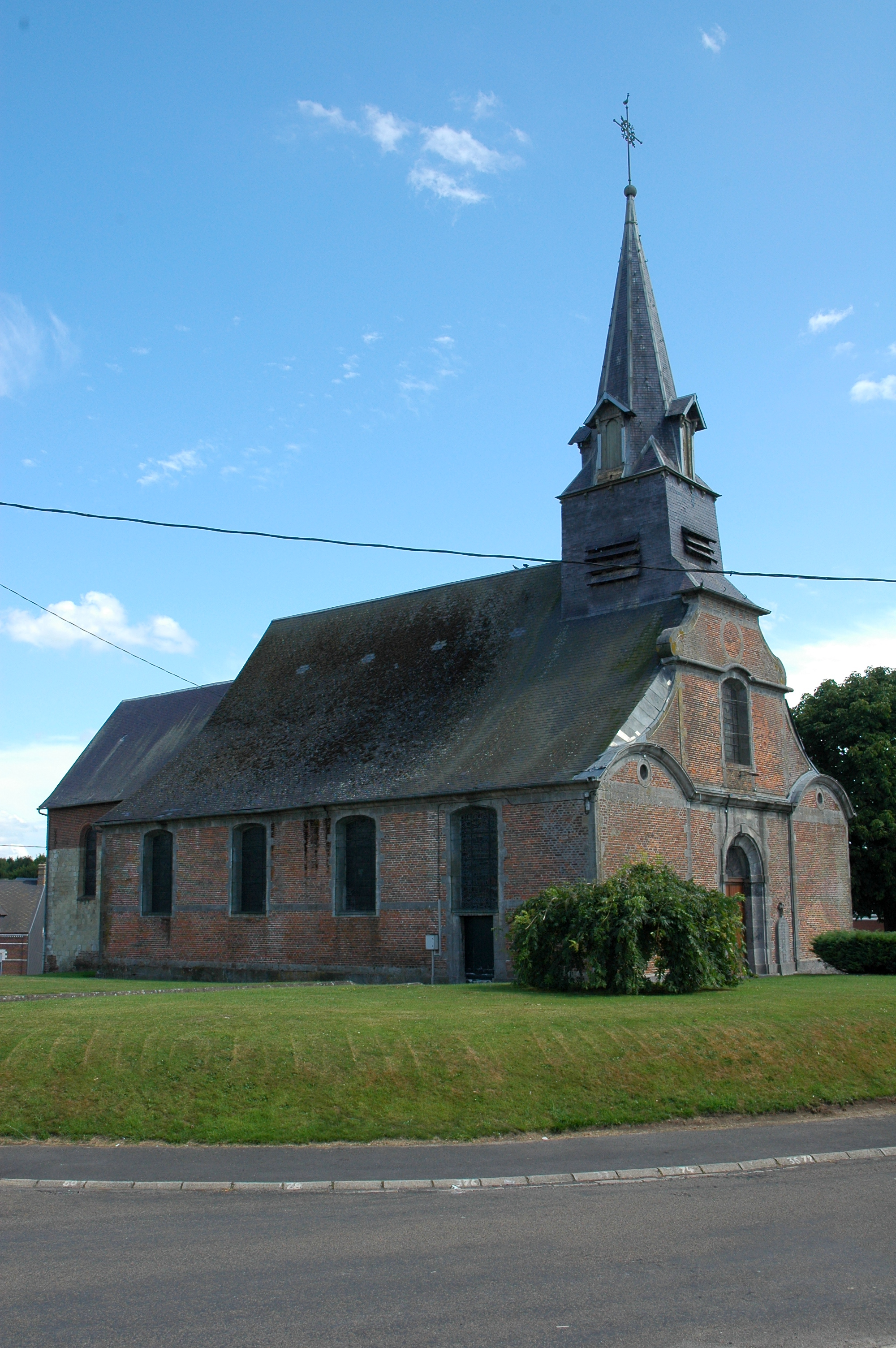
- The church of Boué

- Coat of arms
- Location of Boué
- Location within France Location within Hauts-de-France
- Coordinates: 50°00′46″N 3°41′58″E
- Country: France
- Region: Hauts-de-France
- Department: Aisne
- Arrondissement: Vervins
- Canton: Guise
- Intercommunality: Thiérache du Centre

Government
  - Mayor (2026–32): Éric Donnay
- Area^{1}: 10.44 km^{2} (4.03 sq mi)
- Elevation: 149 m (489 ft)
- Highest elevation: 189 m (620 ft)
- Lowest elevation: 140 m (460 ft)
- Population (2023): 1,315
  - Density: 126.0/km^{2} (326.2/sq mi)
- Time zone: UTC+01:00 (CET)
  - Summer (DST): UTC+02:00 (CEST)
- INSEE/Postal code: 02103 /02450
- ^{1} French Land Register data, which excludes lakes, ponds, glaciers > 1 km^{2} (0.386 sq mi or 247 acres) and river estuaries.

Boué (French pronunciation: [bwe]) is a commune in the department of Aisne in Hauts-de-France in northern France.

== Population ==
Historical population
Year	Pop.	±% p.a.
1968	1,224	—
1975	1,493	+2.88%
1982	1,455	−0.37%
1990	1,369	−0.76%
1999	1,288	−0.68%
2007	1,265	−0.22%
2012	1,278	+0.20%
2017	1,324	+0.71%
2023	1,315	−0.11%
Source: INSEE

== See also ==
- Communes of the Aisne department
