= Sains-Richaumont =

- Commune
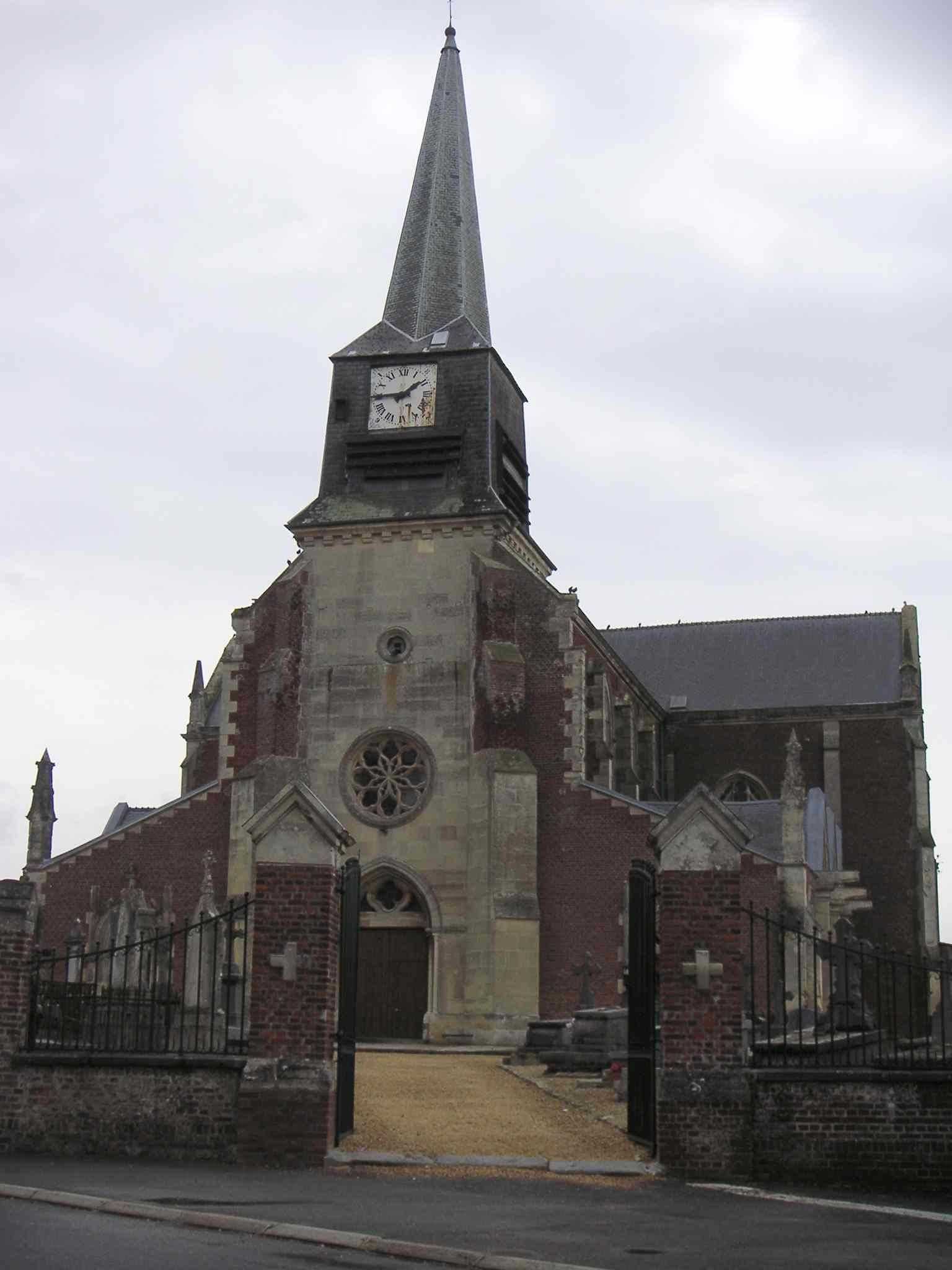
- The church of Sains

- Coat of arms
- Location of Sains-Richaumont
- Location within France Location within Hauts-de-France
- Coordinates: 49°49′29″N 3°42′36″E
- Country: France
- Region: Hauts-de-France
- Department: Aisne
- Arrondissement: Vervins
- Canton: Marle
- Intercommunality: Thiérache du Centre

Government
  - Mayor (2026–32): Jean-Pierre Vieville
- Area^{1}: 12.46 km^{2} (4.81 sq mi)
- Elevation: 156 m (512 ft)
- Highest elevation: 159 m (522 ft)
- Lowest elevation: 96 m (315 ft)
- Population (2023): 923
  - Density: 74.1/km^{2} (192/sq mi)
- Time zone: UTC+01:00 (CET)
  - Summer (DST): UTC+02:00 (CEST)
- INSEE/Postal code: 02668 /02120
- ^{1} French Land Register data, which excludes lakes, ponds, glaciers > 1 km^{2} (0.386 sq mi or 247 acres) and river estuaries.

Sains-Richaumont (French pronunciation: [sɛ̃ ʁiʃomɔ̃]) is a commune in the Aisne department in Hauts-de-France in northern France.

== Population ==
Historical population
Year	Pop.	±% p.a.
1968	1,225	—
1975	1,183	−0.50%
1982	1,132	−0.63%
1990	1,053	−0.90%
1999	951	−1.13%
2007	944	−0.09%
2012	1,037	+1.90%
2017	1,043	+0.12%
2023	923	−2.02%
Source: INSEE

== See also ==
- Communes of the Aisne department
