= Voulpaix =

- Commune
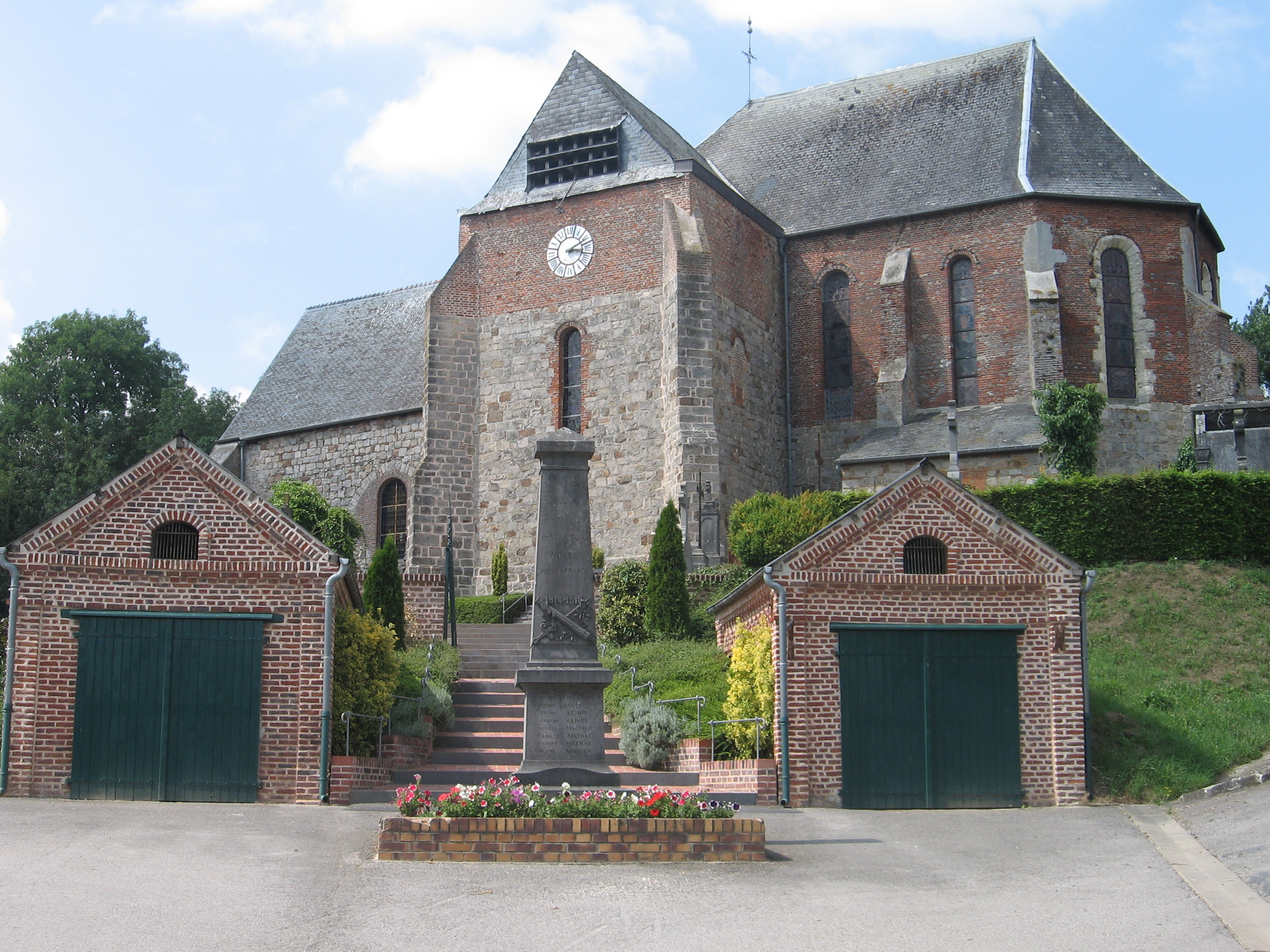
- The church of Voulpaix
- Location of Voulpaix
- Location within France Location within Hauts-de-France
- Coordinates: 49°50′24″N 3°49′53″E
- Country: France
- Region: Hauts-de-France
- Department: Aisne
- Arrondissement: Vervins
- Canton: Marle
- Intercommunality: Thiérache du Centre

Government
  - Mayor (2026–32): Olivier Briatte
- Area^{1}: 11.55 km^{2} (4.46 sq mi)
- Elevation: 190 m (620 ft)
- Highest elevation: 187 m (614 ft)
- Lowest elevation: 114 m (374 ft)
- Population (2023): 348
  - Density: 30.1/km^{2} (78.0/sq mi)
- Time zone: UTC+01:00 (CET)
  - Summer (DST): UTC+02:00 (CEST)
- INSEE/Postal code: 02826 /02140
- ^{1} French Land Register data, which excludes lakes, ponds, glaciers > 1 km^{2} (0.386 sq mi or 247 acres) and river estuaries.

Voulpaix (French pronunciation: [vulpɛ]) is a commune in the Aisne department in Hauts-de-France in northern France.

== Population ==
Historical population
Year	Pop.	±% p.a.
1968	516	—
1975	503	−0.36%
1982	434	−2.09%
1990	404	−0.89%
1999	368	−1.03%
2007	392	+0.79%
2012	417	+1.24%
2017	372	−2.26%
2023	348	−1.11%
Source: INSEE

== Mayor ==
- Gaston Louvet: 1947-1965
- Guy Renaux: 1965-1995
- Michel Degardin: 1995-2008
- Jean-Paul Renaux: 2008–present

== See also ==
- Communes of the Aisne department
