= Hary =

- Commune
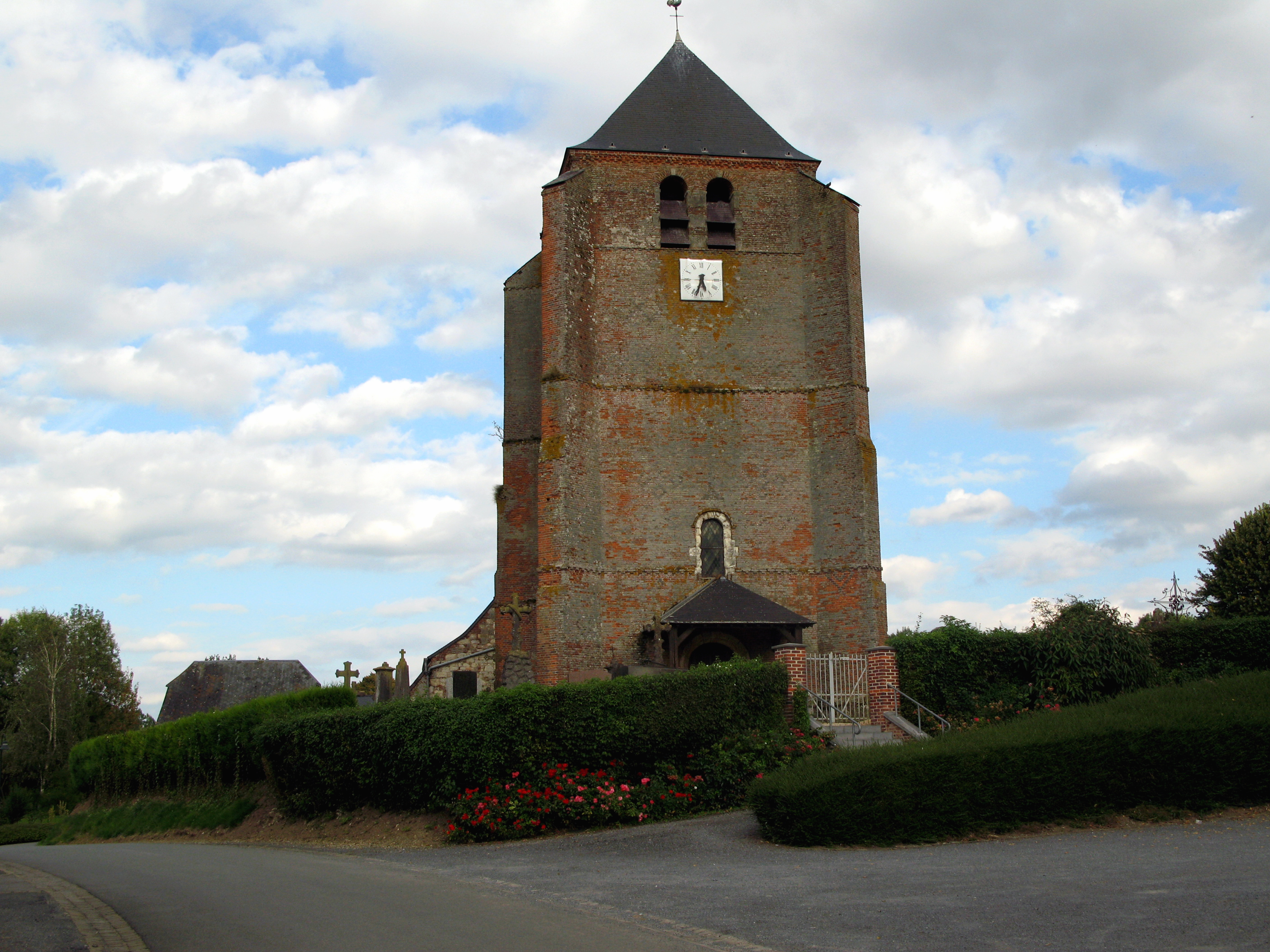
- The church of Hary
- Location of Hary
- Location within France Location within Hauts-de-France
- Coordinates: 49°47′20″N 3°56′02″E
- Country: France
- Region: Hauts-de-France
- Department: Aisne
- Arrondissement: Vervins
- Canton: Vervins
- Intercommunality: Thiérache du Centre

Government
  - Mayor (2026–32): Céline Cus
- Area^{1}: 11.04 km^{2} (4.26 sq mi)
- Elevation: 114 m (374 ft)
- Highest elevation: 192 m (630 ft)
- Lowest elevation: 106 m (348 ft)
- Population (2023): 203
  - Density: 18.4/km^{2} (47.6/sq mi)
- Time zone: UTC+01:00 (CET)
  - Summer (DST): UTC+02:00 (CEST)
- INSEE/Postal code: 02373 /02140
- ^{1} French Land Register data, which excludes lakes, ponds, glaciers > 1 km^{2} (0.386 sq mi or 247 acres) and river estuaries.

Hary (French pronunciation: [aʁi]) is a commune in the Aisne department in Hauts-de-France in northern France.

== Population ==
Historical population
Year	Pop.	±% p.a.
1968	270	—
1975	220	−2.88%
1982	214	−0.39%
1990	221	+0.40%
1999	232	+0.54%
2007	224	−0.44%
2012	223	−0.09%
2017	208	−1.38%
2023	203	−0.40%
Source: INSEE

== See also ==
- Communes of the Aisne department
