= Braye-en-Thiérache =

- Commune
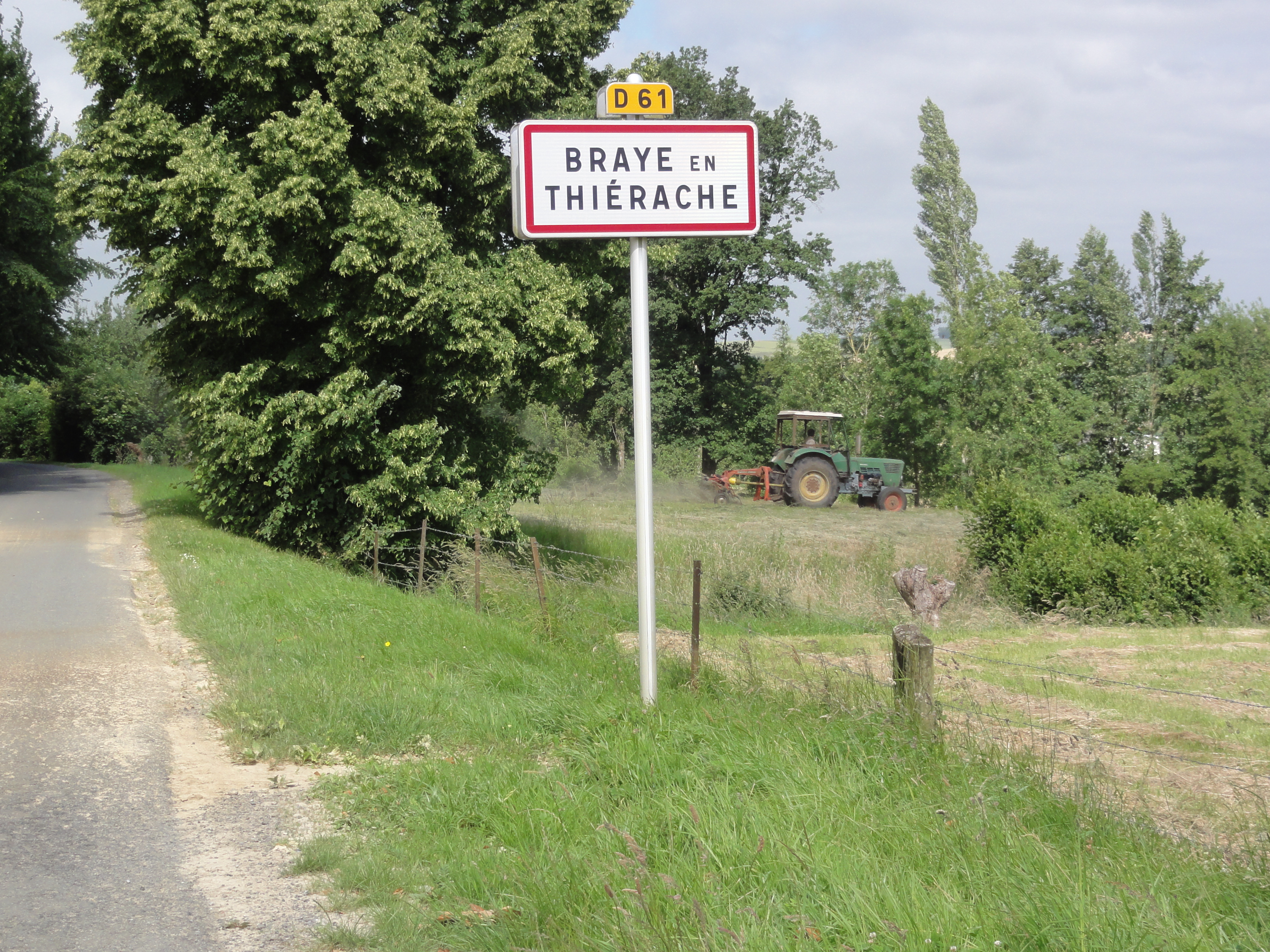
- The road into Braye-en-Thiérache
- Location of Braye-en-Thiérache
- Location within France Location within Hauts-de-France
- Coordinates: 49°46′49″N 3°57′33″E
- Country: France
- Region: Hauts-de-France
- Department: Aisne
- Arrondissement: Vervins
- Canton: Vervins
- Intercommunality: Thiérache du Centre

Government
  - Mayor (2026–32): Mathias Guerdoux
- Area^{1}: 9.17 km^{2} (3.54 sq mi)
- Elevation: 335 m (1,099 ft)
- Highest elevation: 194 m (636 ft)
- Lowest elevation: 115 m (377 ft)
- Population (2023): 131
  - Density: 14.3/km^{2} (37.0/sq mi)
- Time zone: UTC+01:00 (CET)
  - Summer (DST): UTC+02:00 (CEST)
- INSEE/Postal code: 02116 /02140
- ^{1} French Land Register data, which excludes lakes, ponds, glaciers > 1 km^{2} (0.386 sq mi or 247 acres) and river estuaries.

Braye-en-Thiérache (French pronunciation: [bʁɛ ɑ̃ tjeʁaʃ], literally Braye in Thiérache) is a commune in the department of Aisne in Hauts-de-France in northern France.

== Population ==
Historical population
Year	Pop.	±% p.a.
1968	278	—
1975	220	−3.29%
1982	172	−3.46%
1990	175	+0.22%
1999	153	−1.48%
2007	153	+0.00%
2012	133	−2.76%
2017	146	+1.88%
2023	131	−1.79%
Source: INSEE

== See also ==
- Communes of the Aisne department
