= Berlancourt, Aisne =

Berlancourt
- Commune
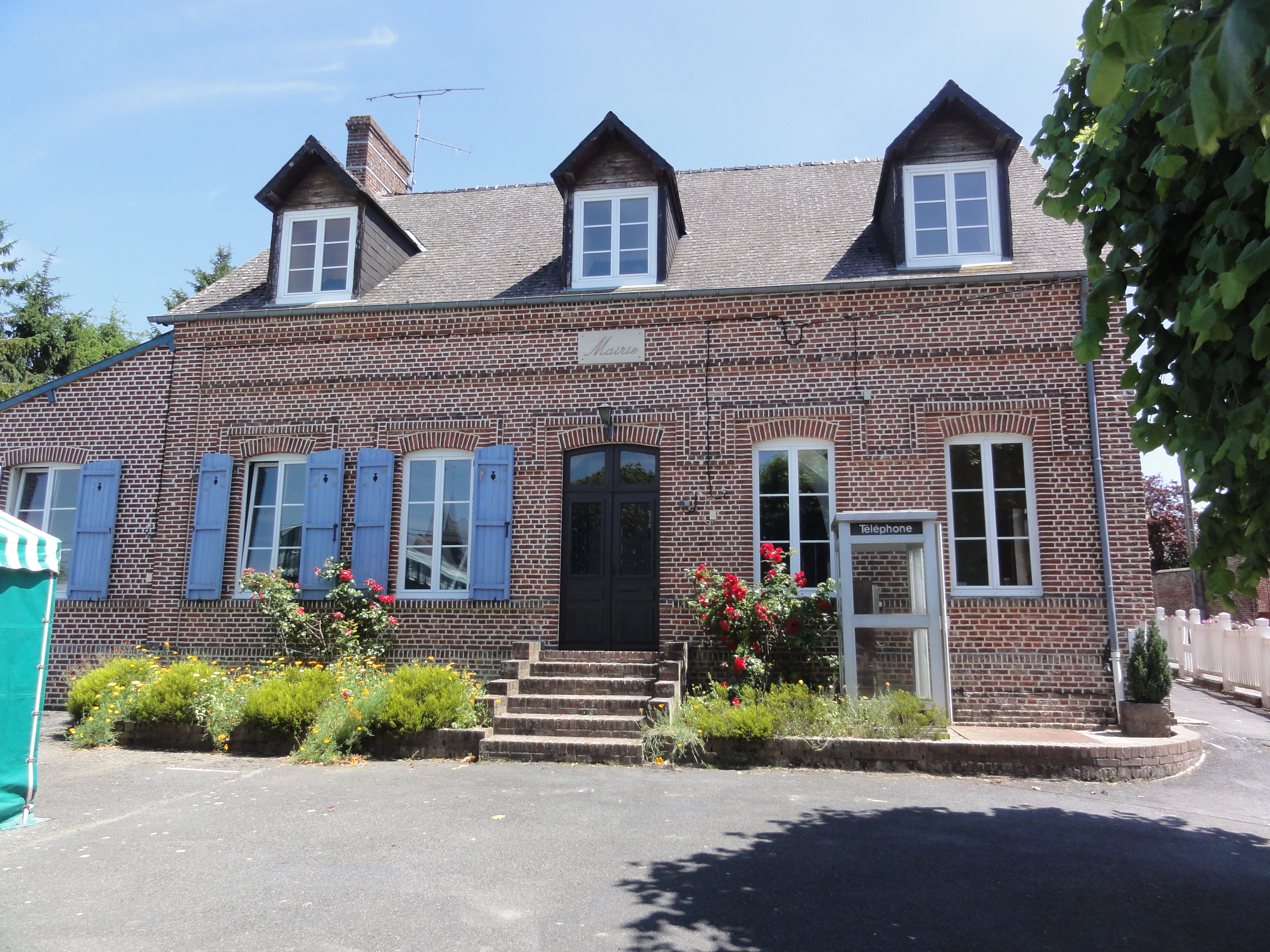
- Town hall

- Coat of arms
- Location of Berlancourt
- Location within France Location within Hauts-de-France
- Coordinates: 49°46′46″N 3°45′32″E
- Country: France
- Region: Hauts-de-France
- Department: Aisne
- Arrondissement: Vervins
- Canton: Marle
- Intercommunality: Thiérache du Centre

Government
  - Mayor (2026–32): Philippe Torre
- Area^{1}: 5.2 km^{2} (2.0 sq mi)
- Elevation: 140 m (460 ft)
- Highest elevation: 156 m (512 ft)
- Lowest elevation: 105 m (344 ft)
- Population (2023): 85
  - Density: 16/km^{2} (42/sq mi)
- Time zone: UTC+01:00 (CET)
  - Summer (DST): UTC+02:00 (CEST)
- INSEE/Postal code: 02068 /02250
- ^{1} French Land Register data, which excludes lakes, ponds, glaciers > 1 km^{2} (0.386 sq mi or 247 acres) and river estuaries.

Berlancourt (French pronunciation: [bɛʁlɑ̃kuʁ]) is a commune in the department of Aisne in Hauts-de-France in northern France.

== Population ==
Historical population
Year	Pop.	±% p.a.
1968	122	—
1975	120	−0.24%
1982	117	−0.36%
1990	112	−0.54%
1999	93	−2.04%
2007	92	−0.14%
2012	106	+2.87%
2017	103	−0.57%
2023	85	−3.15%
Source: INSEE

== See also ==
- Communes of the Aisne department
