= Cuiry-lès-Iviers =

- Commune
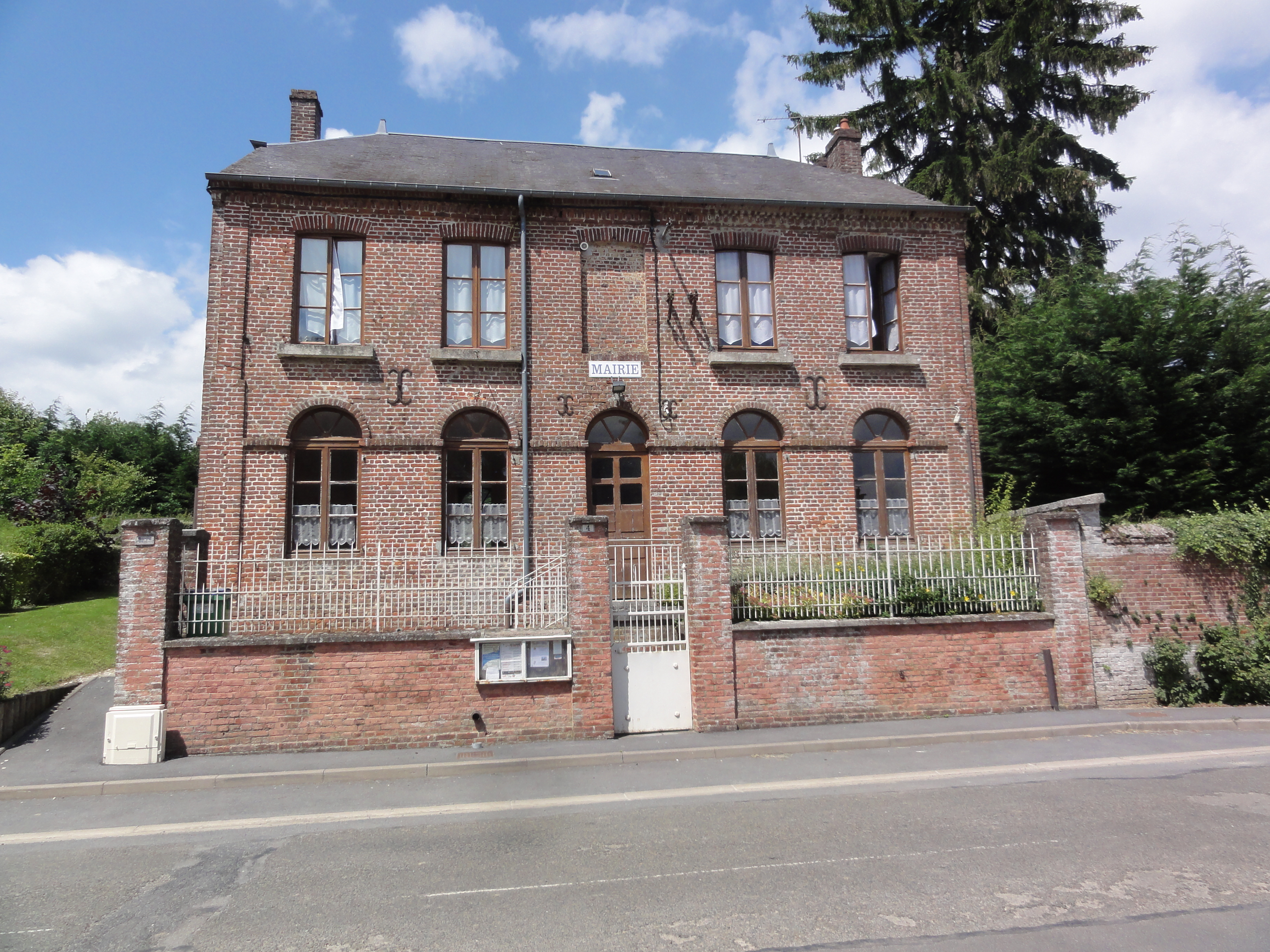
- The town hall of Cuiry-lès-Iviers
- Location of Cuiry-lès-Iviers
- Location within France Location within Hauts-de-France
- Coordinates: 49°45′43″N 4°06′37″E
- Country: France
- Region: Hauts-de-France
- Department: Aisne
- Arrondissement: Vervins
- Canton: Vervins
- Intercommunality: Portes de la Thiérache

Government
  - Mayor (2026–32): Faustin Guilmart
- Area^{1}: 4.79 km^{2} (1.85 sq mi)
- Elevation: 168 m (551 ft)
- Highest elevation: 221 m (725 ft)
- Lowest elevation: 162 m (531 ft)
- Population (2023): 28
  - Density: 5.8/km^{2} (15/sq mi)
- Time zone: UTC+01:00 (CET)
  - Summer (DST): UTC+02:00 (CEST)
- INSEE/Postal code: 02251 /02360
- ^{1} French Land Register data, which excludes lakes, ponds, glaciers > 1 km^{2} (0.386 sq mi or 247 acres) and river estuaries.

Cuiry-lès-Iviers (French pronunciation: [kɥiʁi lɛ.z‿ivje], literally Cuiry near Iviers) is a commune in the Aisne department in Hauts-de-France in northern France.

== Population ==
Historical population
Year	Pop.	±% p.a.
1968	66	—
1975	50	−3.89%
1982	48	−0.58%
1990	40	−2.25%
1999	40	+0.00%
2007	39	−0.32%
2012	34	−2.71%
2017	28	−3.81%
2023	28	+0.00%
Source: INSEE

== See also ==
- Communes of the Aisne department
