= Rouvroy-sur-Serre =

- Commune
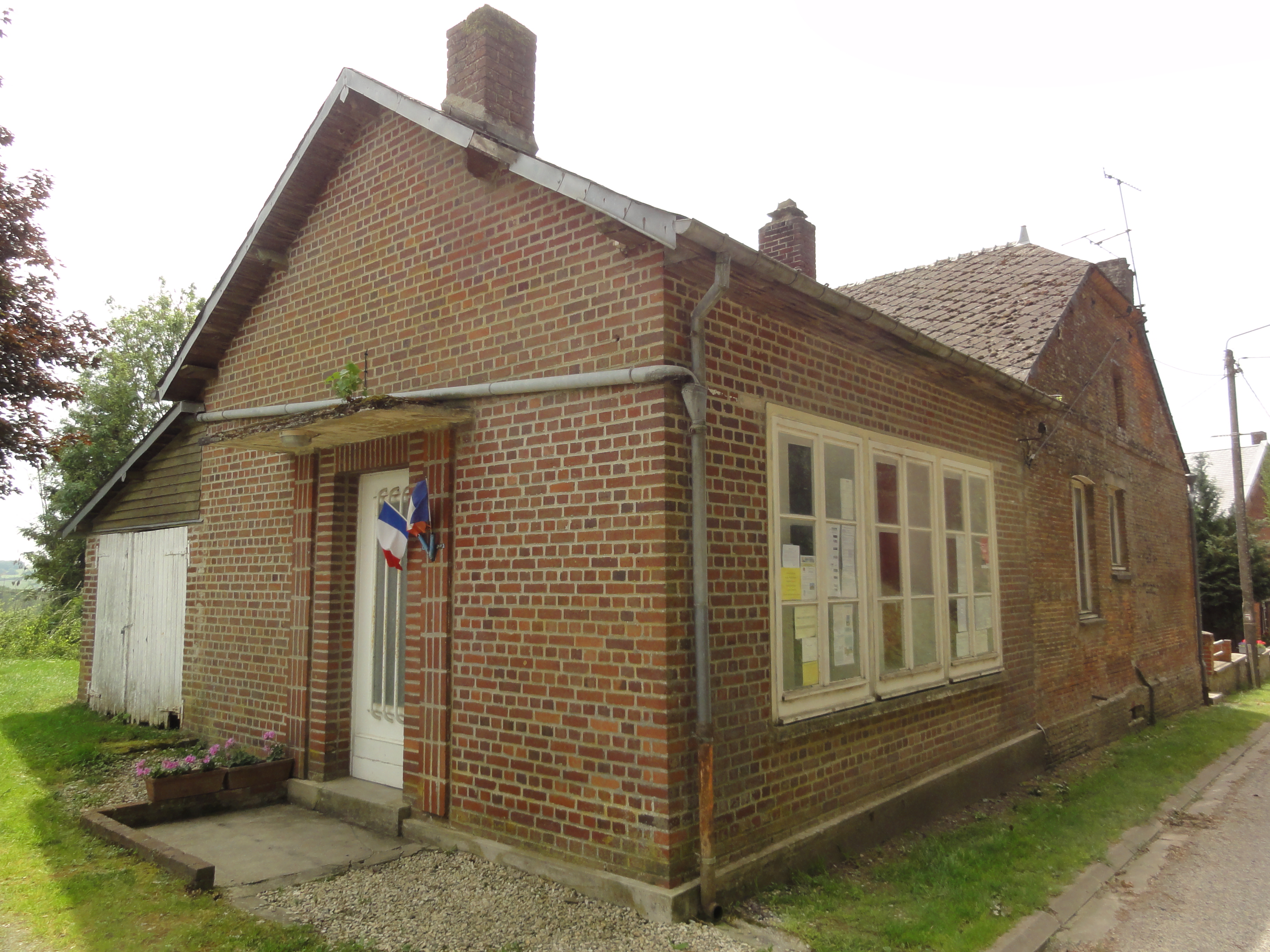
- The town hall of Rouvroy-sur-Serre
- Location of Rouvroy-sur-Serre
- Location within France Location within Hauts-de-France
- Coordinates: 49°43′15″N 4°10′41″E
- Country: France
- Region: Hauts-de-France
- Department: Aisne
- Arrondissement: Vervins
- Canton: Vervins
- Intercommunality: Portes de la Thiérache

Government
  - Mayor (2026–32): Thérèse Bertrand
- Area^{1}: 3.9 km^{2} (1.5 sq mi)
- Elevation: 175 m (574 ft)
- Highest elevation: 233 m (764 ft)
- Lowest elevation: 143 m (469 ft)
- Population (2023): 45
  - Density: 12/km^{2} (30/sq mi)
- Time zone: UTC+01:00 (CET)
  - Summer (DST): UTC+02:00 (CEST)
- INSEE/Postal code: 02660 /02360
- ^{1} French Land Register data, which excludes lakes, ponds, glaciers > 1 km^{2} (0.386 sq mi or 247 acres) and river estuaries.

Rouvroy-sur-Serre (French pronunciation: [ʁuvʁwa syʁ sɛʁ], literally Rouvroy on Serre) is a commune in the Aisne department in Hauts-de-France in northern France.

== Population ==
Historical population
Year	Pop.	±% p.a.
1968	89	—
1975	88	−0.16%
1982	68	−3.62%
1990	70	+0.36%
1999	51	−3.46%
2007	44	−1.83%
2012	41	−1.40%
2017	39	−1.00%
2023	45	+2.41%
Source: INSEE

== See also ==
- Communes of the Aisne department
