= Chéry-lès-Rozoy =

- Commune
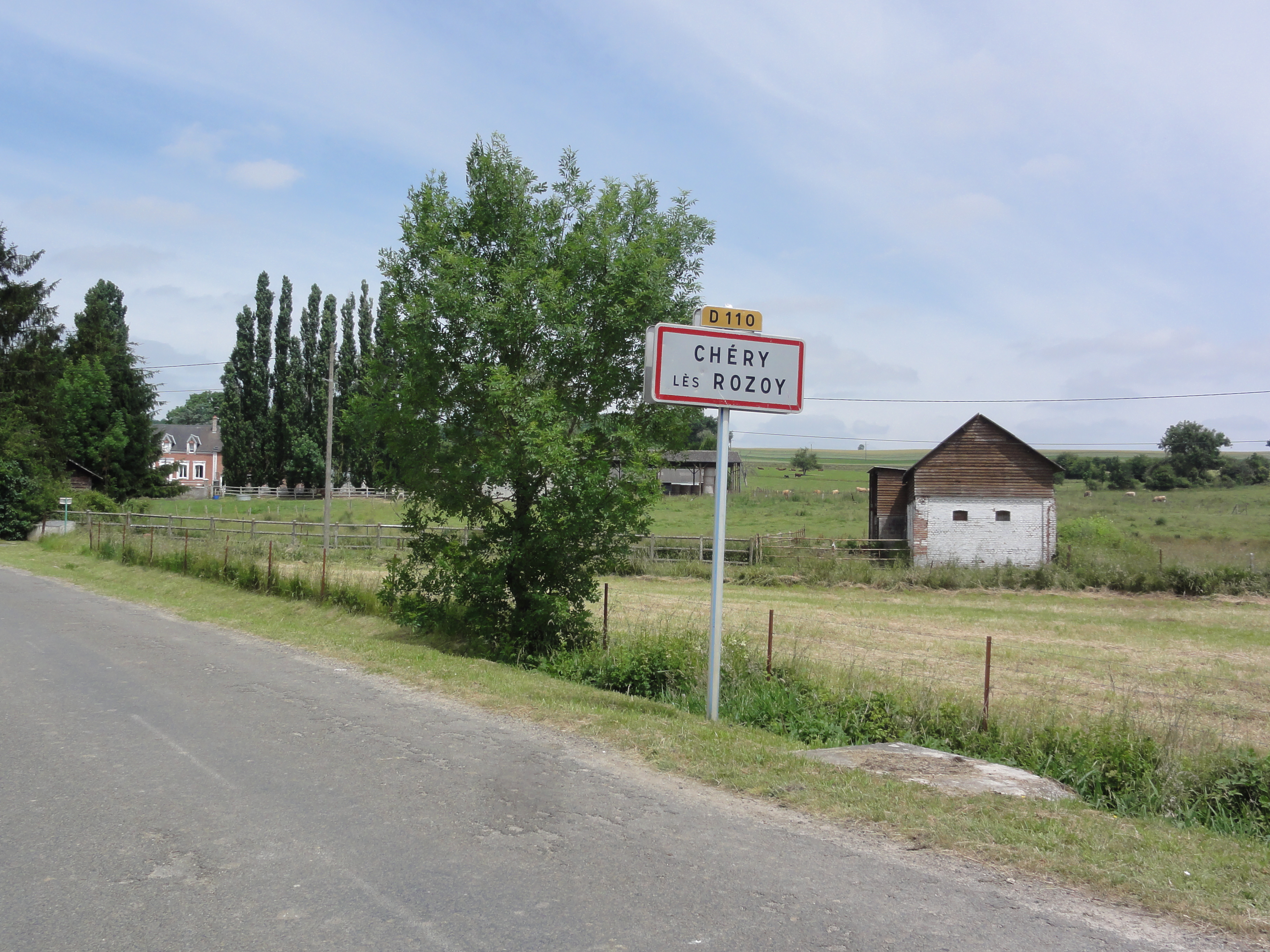
- The road into Chéry-lès-Rozoy
- Location of Chéry-lès-Rozoy
- Location within France Location within Hauts-de-France
- Coordinates: 49°43′16″N 4°05′31″E
- Country: France
- Region: Hauts-de-France
- Department: Aisne
- Arrondissement: Vervins
- Canton: Vervins
- Intercommunality: Portes de la Thiérache

Government
  - Mayor (2026–32): Fabrice Luce
- Area^{1}: 4.73 km^{2} (1.83 sq mi)
- Elevation: 136 m (446 ft)
- Highest elevation: 215 m (705 ft)
- Lowest elevation: 127 m (417 ft)
- Population (2023): 98
  - Density: 21/km^{2} (54/sq mi)
- Time zone: UTC+01:00 (CET)
  - Summer (DST): UTC+02:00 (CEST)
- INSEE/Postal code: 02181 /02360
- ^{1} French Land Register data, which excludes lakes, ponds, glaciers > 1 km^{2} (0.386 sq mi or 247 acres) and river estuaries.

Chéry-lès-Rozoy (French pronunciation: [ʃeʁi lɛ ʁozwa], literally Chéry near Rozoy) is a commune in the Aisne department in Hauts-de-France in northern France.

== Population ==
Historical population
Year	Pop.	±% p.a.
1968	142	—
1975	144	+0.20%
1982	145	+0.10%
1990	100	−4.54%
1999	114	+1.47%
2007	101	−1.50%
2012	106	+0.97%
2017	80	−5.47%
2023	98	+3.44%
Source: INSEE

== See also ==
- Communes of the Aisne department
