= Rocquigny, Aisne =

Rocquigny
- Commune
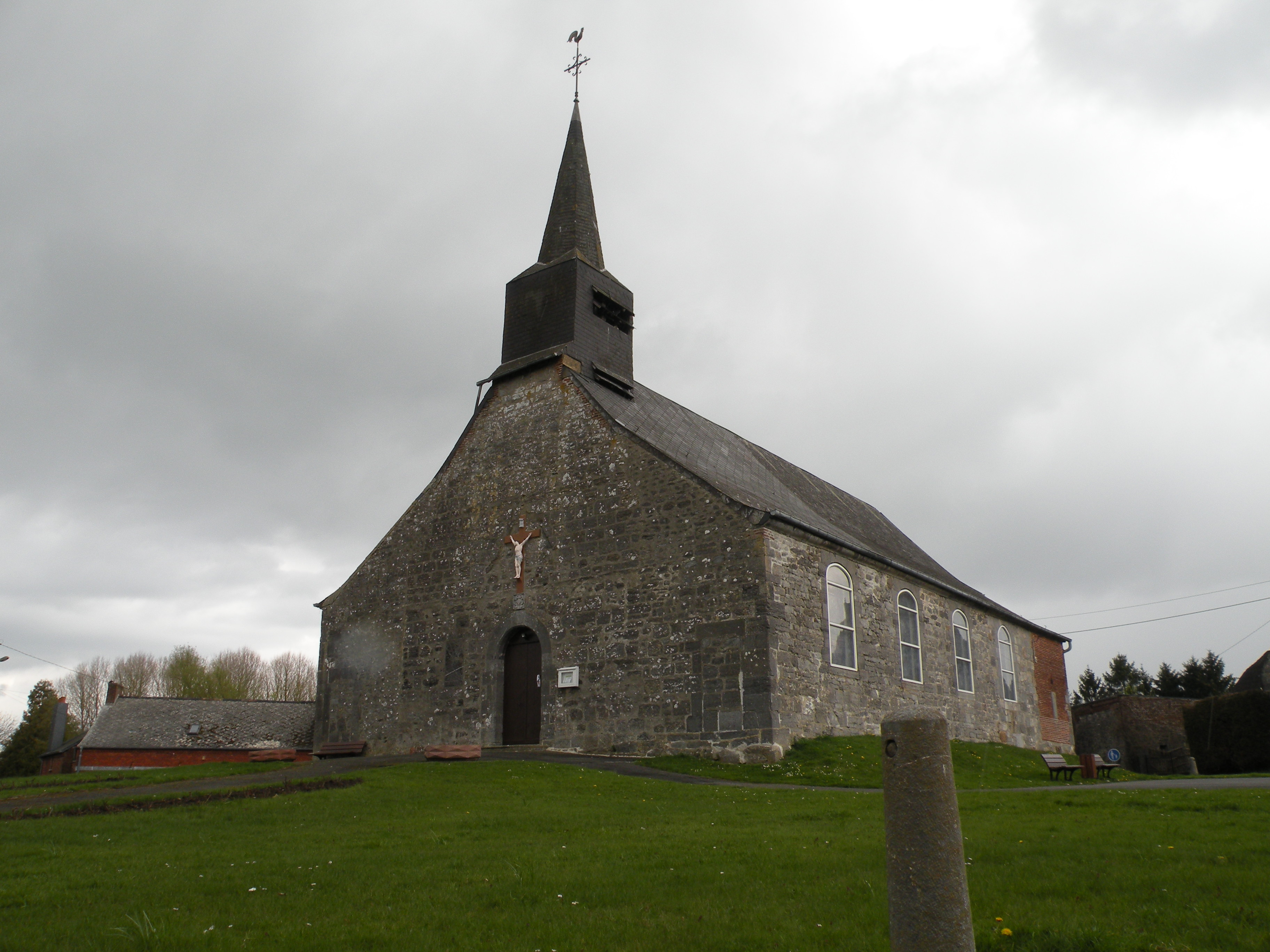
- The church of Rocquigny
- Location of Rocquigny
- Location within France Location within Hauts-de-France
- Coordinates: 50°01′27″N 3°58′56″E
- Country: France
- Region: Hauts-de-France
- Department: Aisne
- Arrondissement: Vervins
- Canton: Vervins
- Intercommunality: Thiérache du Centre

Government
  - Mayor (2026–32): Paul Seret
- Area^{1}: 10.99 km^{2} (4.24 sq mi)
- Elevation: 217 m (712 ft)
- Highest elevation: 231 m (758 ft)
- Lowest elevation: 157 m (515 ft)
- Population (2023): 359
  - Density: 32.7/km^{2} (84.6/sq mi)
- Time zone: UTC+01:00 (CET)
  - Summer (DST): UTC+02:00 (CEST)
- INSEE/Postal code: 02650 /02260
- ^{1} French Land Register data, which excludes lakes, ponds, glaciers > 1 km^{2} (0.386 sq mi or 247 acres) and river estuaries.

Rocquigny (French pronunciation: [ʁɔkiɲi]) is a commune in the Aisne department in Hauts-de-France in northern France.

== Population ==
Historical population
Year	Pop.	±% p.a.
1968	438	—
1975	426	−0.40%
1982	407	−0.65%
1990	424	+0.51%
1999	392	−0.87%
2007	392	+0.00%
2012	389	−0.15%
2017	361	−1.48%
2023	359	−0.09%
Source: INSEE

== See also ==
- Communes of the Aisne department
