= Étréaupont =

- Commune
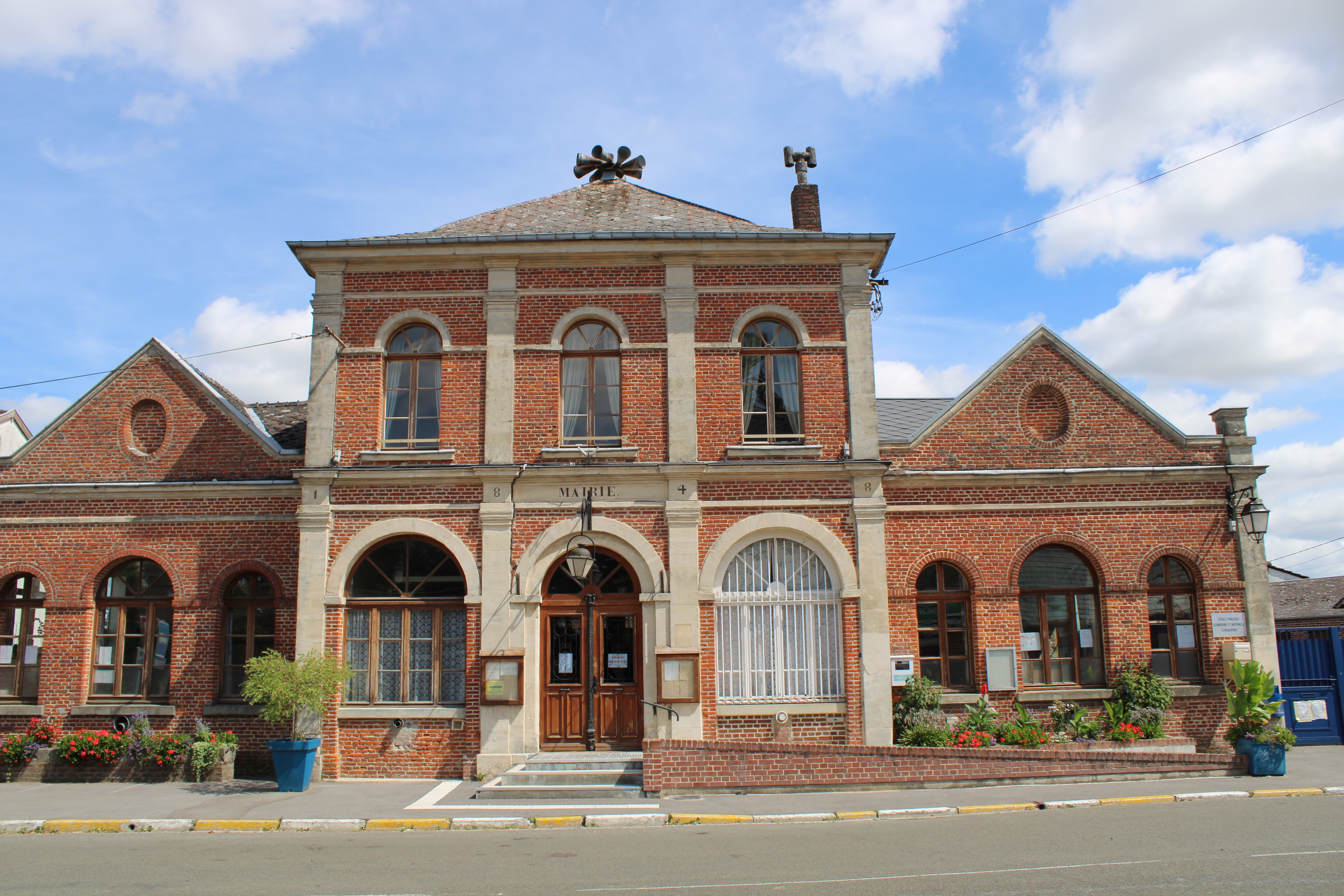
- The town hall and school of Étréaupont
- Location of Étréaupont
- Location within France Location within Hauts-de-France
- Coordinates: 49°54′14″N 3°55′00″E
- Country: France
- Region: Hauts-de-France
- Department: Aisne
- Arrondissement: Vervins
- Canton: Vervins
- Intercommunality: Thiérache du Centre

Government
  - Mayor (2026–32): Willy Gaudion
- Area^{1}: 17.59 km^{2} (6.79 sq mi)
- Elevation: 127 m (417 ft)
- Highest elevation: 227 m (745 ft)
- Lowest elevation: 120 m (390 ft)
- Population (2023): 839
  - Density: 47.7/km^{2} (124/sq mi)
- Time zone: UTC+01:00 (CET)
  - Summer (DST): UTC+02:00 (CEST)
- INSEE/Postal code: 02295 /02580
- ^{1} French Land Register data, which excludes lakes, ponds, glaciers > 1 km^{2} (0.386 sq mi or 247 acres) and river estuaries.

Étréaupont (French pronunciation: [etʁeopɔ̃]) is a commune in the Aisne department and Hauts-de-France region of northern France.

== Population ==
Historical population
Year	Pop.	±% p.a.
1968	1,015	—
1975	969	−0.66%
1982	955	−0.21%
1990	966	+0.14%
1999	933	−0.39%
2007	859	−1.03%
2012	926	+1.51%
2017	859	−1.49%
2023	839	−0.39%
Source: INSEE

== See also ==
- Communes of the Aisne department
