= Puisieux-et-Clanlieu =

- Commune
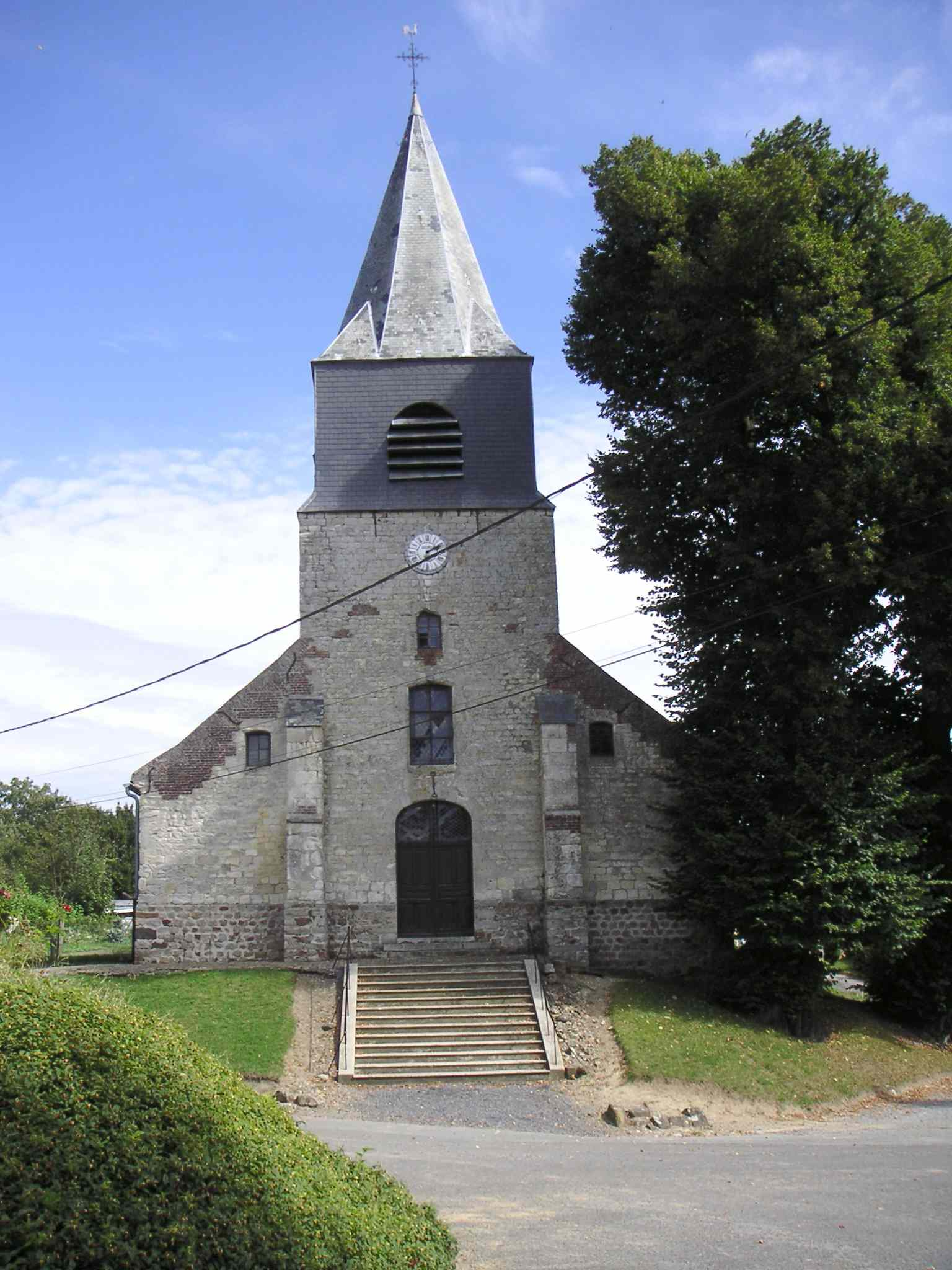
- The church of Puisieux

- Coat of arms
- Location of Puisieux-et-Clanlieu
- Location within France Location within Hauts-de-France
- Coordinates: 49°51′17″N 3°40′42″E
- Country: France
- Region: Hauts-de-France
- Department: Aisne
- Arrondissement: Vervins
- Canton: Marle
- Intercommunality: Thiérache du Centre

Government
  - Mayor (2026–32): Jean Grenier
- Area^{1}: 17.42 km^{2} (6.73 sq mi)
- Elevation: 125 m (410 ft)
- Highest elevation: 160 m (520 ft)
- Lowest elevation: 99 m (325 ft)
- Population (2023): 331
  - Density: 19.0/km^{2} (49.2/sq mi)
- Time zone: UTC+01:00 (CET)
  - Summer (DST): UTC+02:00 (CEST)
- INSEE/Postal code: 02629 /02120
- ^{1} French Land Register data, which excludes lakes, ponds, glaciers > 1 km^{2} (0.386 sq mi or 247 acres) and river estuaries.

Puisieux-et-Clanlieu (French pronunciation: [pɥizjø e klɑ̃ljø]) is a commune in the Aisne department in Hauts-de-France in northern France.

== Population ==
Historical population
Year	Pop.	±% p.a.
1968	340	—
1975	322	−0.77%
1982	301	−0.96%
1990	288	−0.55%
1999	299	+0.42%
2007	301	+0.08%
2012	293	−0.54%
2017	289	−0.27%
2023	331	+2.29%
Source: INSEE

== See also ==
- Communes of the Aisne department
