= Résigny =

- Commune
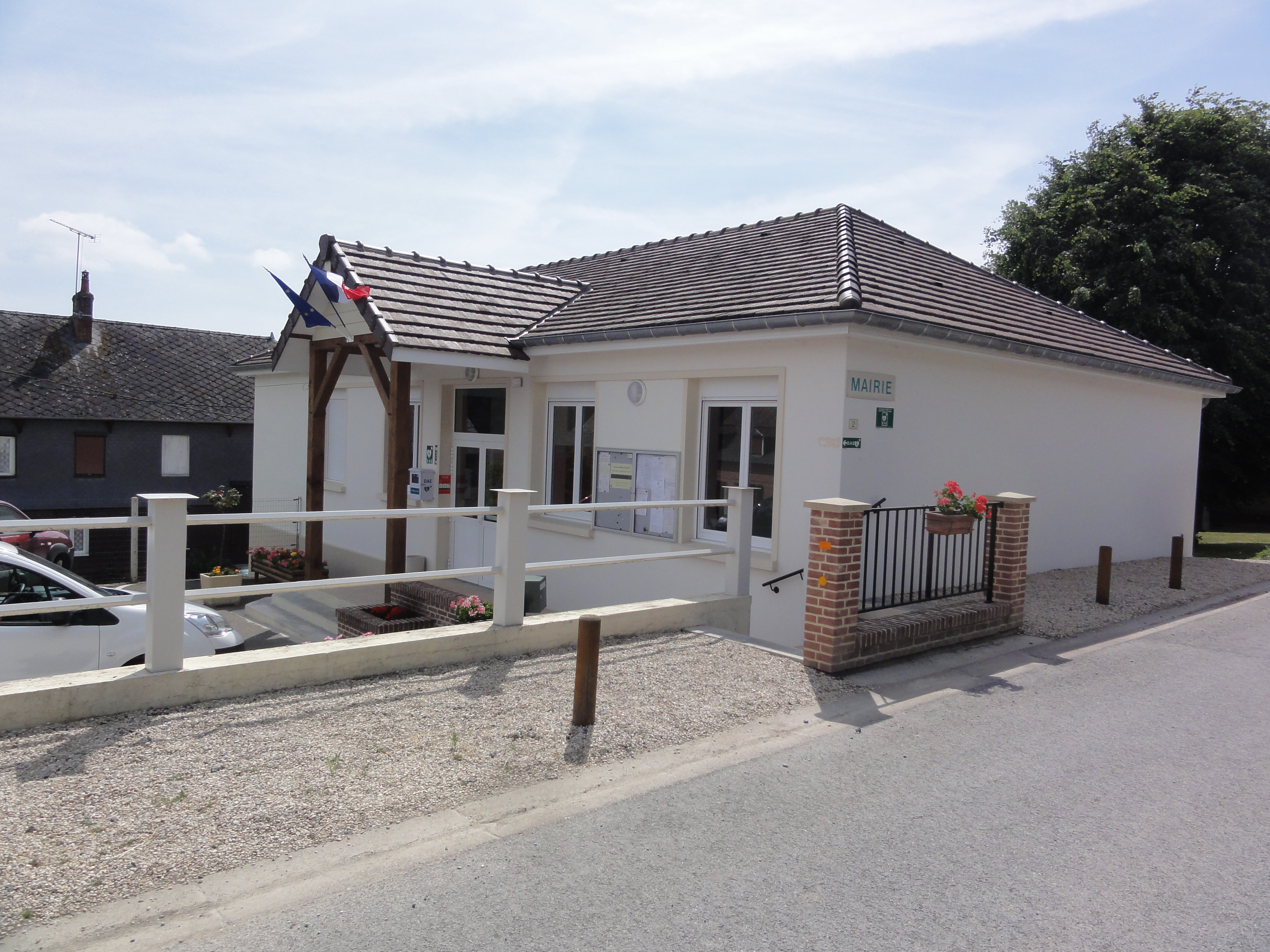
- The town hall of Résigny

- Coat of arms
- Location of Résigny
- Location within France Location within Hauts-de-France
- Coordinates: 49°44′14″N 4°12′32″E
- Country: France
- Region: Hauts-de-France
- Department: Aisne
- Arrondissement: Vervins
- Canton: Vervins
- Intercommunality: Portes de la Thiérache

Government
  - Mayor (2026–32): Alain Charlier
- Area^{1}: 7.83 km^{2} (3.02 sq mi)
- Elevation: 150 m (490 ft)
- Highest elevation: 244 m (801 ft)
- Lowest elevation: 157 m (515 ft)
- Population (2023): 157
  - Density: 20.1/km^{2} (51.9/sq mi)
- Time zone: UTC+01:00 (CET)
  - Summer (DST): UTC+02:00 (CEST)
- INSEE/Postal code: 02642 /02360
- ^{1} French Land Register data, which excludes lakes, ponds, glaciers > 1 km^{2} (0.386 sq mi or 247 acres) and river estuaries.

Résigny (French pronunciation: [ʁeziɲi]) is a commune in the Aisne department in Hauts-de-France in northern France.

== Population ==
Historical population
Year	Pop.	±% p.a.
1968	320	—
1975	323	+0.13%
1982	271	−2.48%
1990	238	−1.61%
1999	208	−1.49%
2007	164	−2.93%
2012	177	+1.54%
2017	186	+1.00%
2023	157	−2.79%
Source: INSEE

== See also ==
- Communes of the Aisne department
