= Sainte-Geneviève, Aisne =

Sainte-Geneviève
- Commune
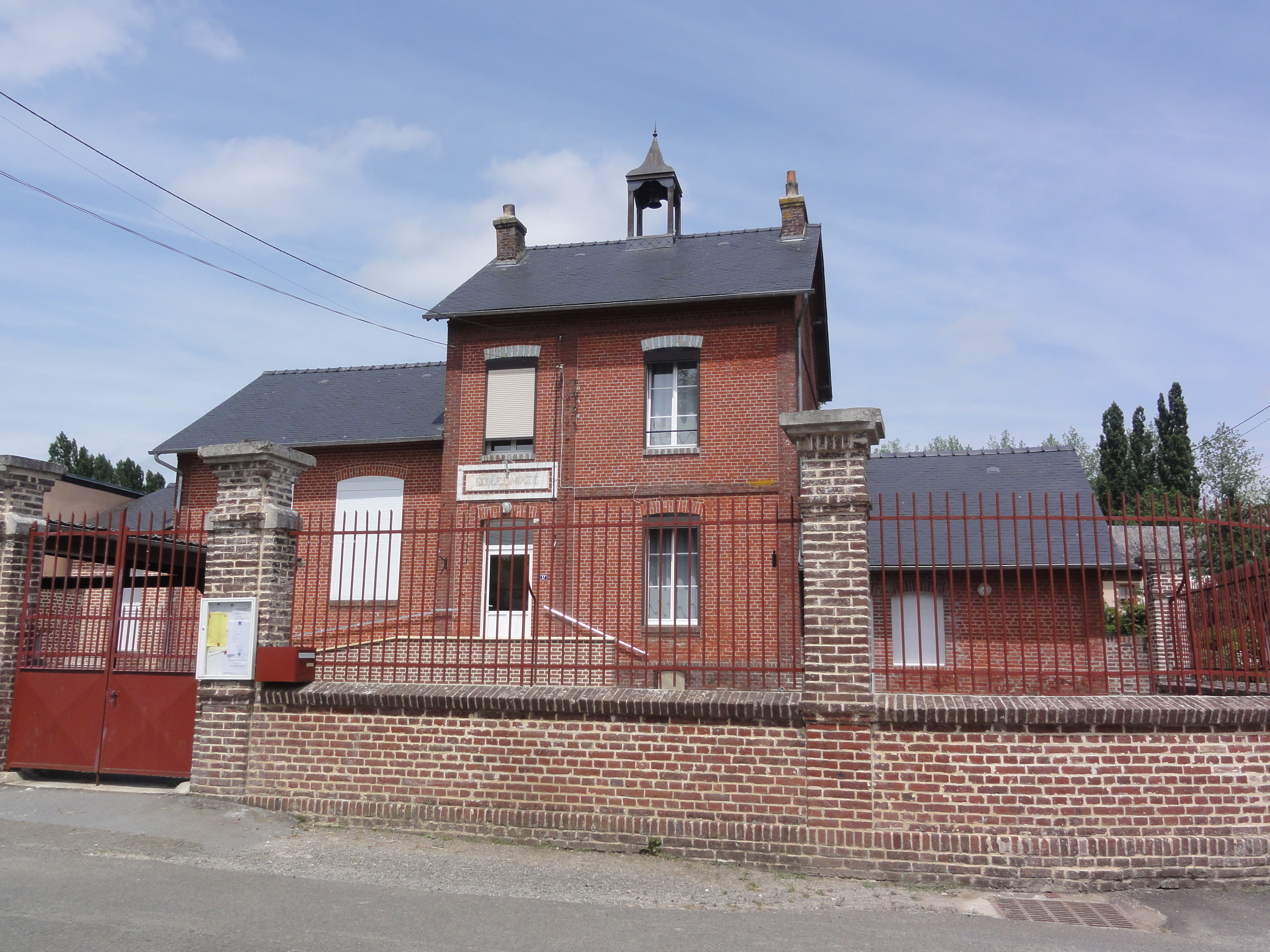
- The town hall and school of Sainte-Geneviève
- Location of Sainte-Geneviève
- Location within France Location within Hauts-de-France
- Coordinates: 49°43′11″N 4°04′20″E
- Country: France
- Region: Hauts-de-France
- Department: Aisne
- Arrondissement: Vervins
- Canton: Vervins
- Intercommunality: Portes de la Thiérache

Government
  - Mayor (2026–32): Emilie Lelong
- Area^{1}: 4.53 km^{2} (1.75 sq mi)
- Elevation: 187 m (614 ft)
- Highest elevation: 211 m (692 ft)
- Lowest elevation: 126 m (413 ft)
- Population (2023): 73
  - Density: 16/km^{2} (42/sq mi)
- Time zone: UTC+01:00 (CET)
  - Summer (DST): UTC+02:00 (CEST)
- INSEE/Postal code: 02678 /02340
- ^{1} French Land Register data, which excludes lakes, ponds, glaciers > 1 km^{2} (0.386 sq mi or 247 acres) and river estuaries.

Sainte-Geneviève (French pronunciation: [sɛ̃t ʒənvjɛv]) is a commune in the Aisne department in Hauts-de-France in northern France.

== Population ==
Historical population
Year	Pop.	±% p.a.
1968	117	—
1975	95	−2.93%
1982	95	+0.00%
1990	85	−1.38%
1999	63	−3.27%
2007	74	+2.03%
2012	76	+0.53%
2017	71	−1.35%
2023	73	+0.46%
Source: INSEE

== See also ==
- Communes of the Aisne department
