= Dohis =

- Commune
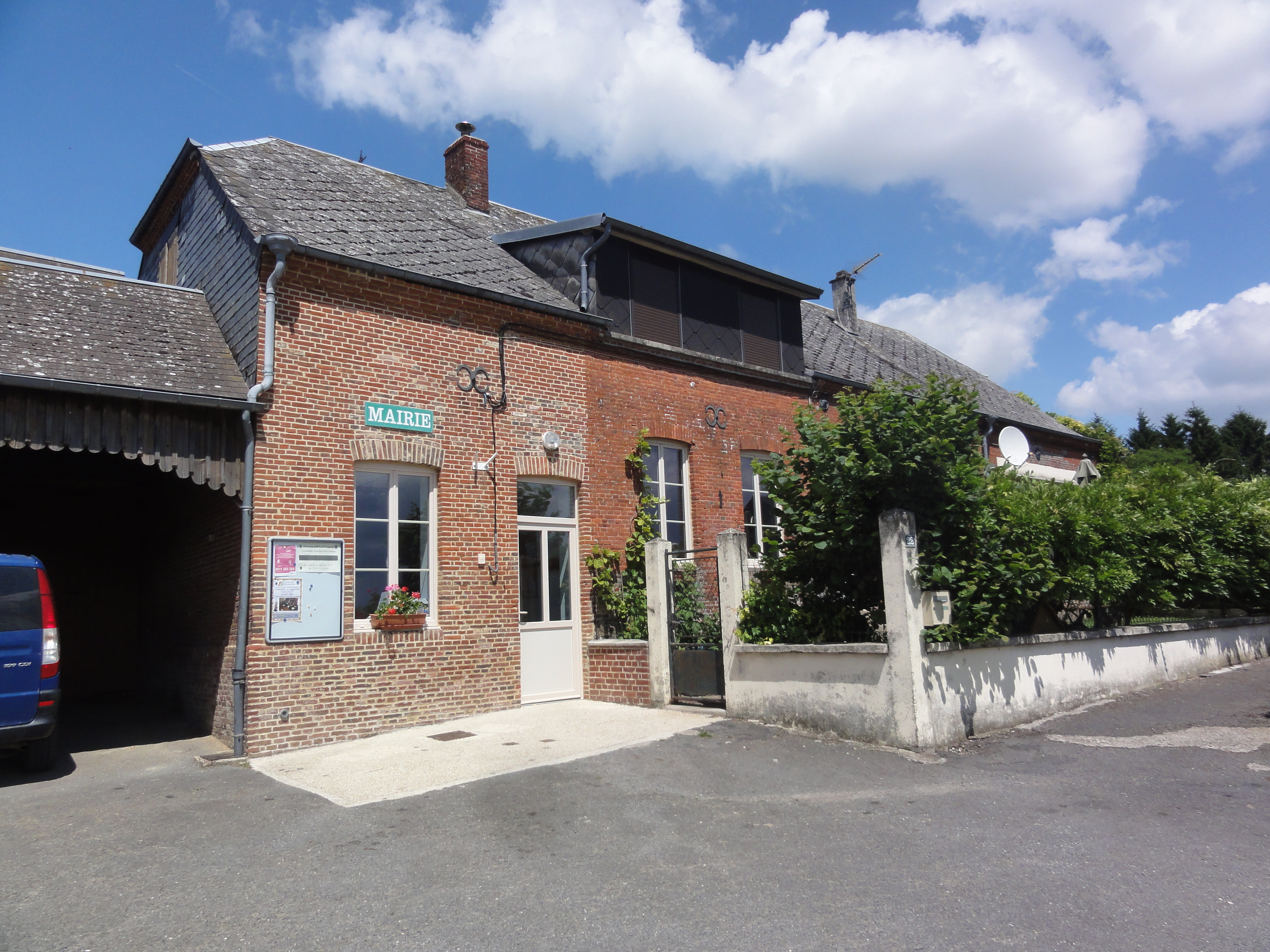
- The town hall of Dohis
- Location of Dohis
- Location within France Location within Hauts-de-France
- Coordinates: 49°45′44″N 4°08′11″E
- Country: France
- Region: Hauts-de-France
- Department: Aisne
- Arrondissement: Vervins
- Canton: Vervins
- Intercommunality: Portes de la Thiérache

Government
  - Mayor (2026–32): Alain Latour
- Area^{1}: 8.1 km^{2} (3.1 sq mi)
- Elevation: 201 m (659 ft)
- Highest elevation: 243 m (797 ft)
- Lowest elevation: 175 m (574 ft)
- Population (2023): 84
  - Density: 10/km^{2} (27/sq mi)
- Time zone: UTC+01:00 (CET)
  - Summer (DST): UTC+02:00 (CEST)
- INSEE/Postal code: 02265 /02360
- ^{1} French Land Register data, which excludes lakes, ponds, glaciers > 1 km^{2} (0.386 sq mi or 247 acres) and river estuaries.

Dohis is a commune in the Aisne department in Hauts-de-France in northern France.

== Population ==
Historical population
| Year | Pop. | ±% p.a. |
|---|---|---|
| 1968 | 176 | — |
| 1975 | 141 | −3.12% |
| 1982 | 134 | −0.72% |
| 1990 | 126 | −0.77% |
| 1999 | 111 | −1.40% |
| 2007 | 83 | −3.57% |
| 2012 | 99 | +3.59% |
| 2017 | 99 | +0.00% |
| 2023 | 84 | −2.70% |
Source: INSEE

== See also ==
- Communes of the Aisne department
