= Clermont-les-Fermes =

- Commune
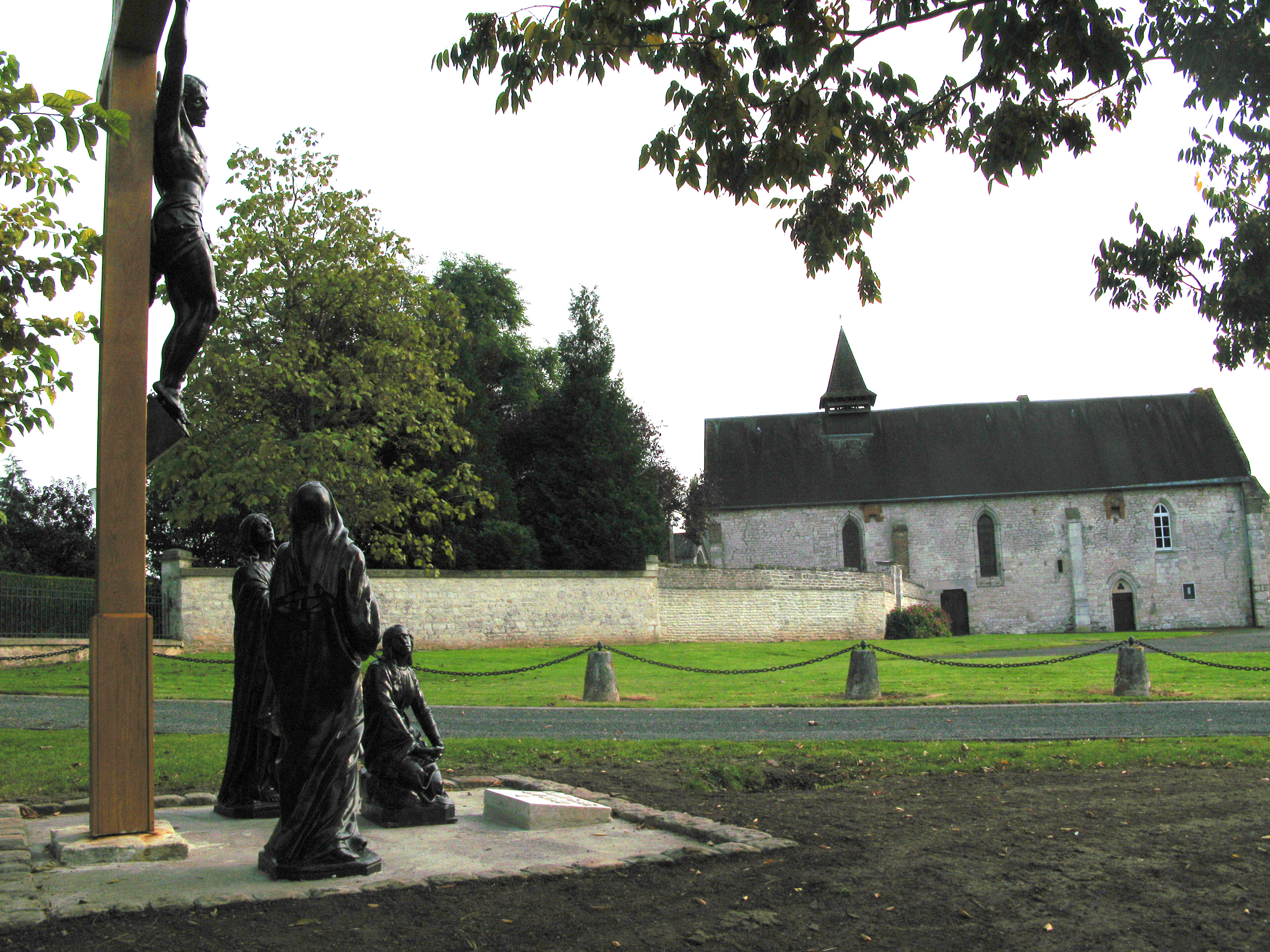
- The church of Clermont-les-Fermes

- Coat of arms
- Location of Clermont-les-Fermes
- Location within France Location within Hauts-de-France
- Coordinates: 49°40′04″N 3°56′21″E
- Country: France
- Region: Hauts-de-France
- Department: Aisne
- Arrondissement: Vervins
- Canton: Vervins

Government
  - Mayor (2026–32): Laurent Gard
- Area^{1}: 9.3 km^{2} (3.6 sq mi)
- Elevation: 128 m (420 ft)
- Highest elevation: 149 m (489 ft)
- Lowest elevation: 99 m (325 ft)
- Population (2023): 97
  - Density: 10/km^{2} (27/sq mi)
- Time zone: UTC+01:00 (CET)
  - Summer (DST): UTC+02:00 (CEST)
- INSEE/Postal code: 02200 /02340
- ^{1} French Land Register data, which excludes lakes, ponds, glaciers > 1 km^{2} (0.386 sq mi or 247 acres) and river estuaries.

Clermont-les-Fermes (French pronunciation: [klɛʁmɔ̃ le fɛʁm]) is a commune in the Aisne department in Hauts-de-France in northern France.

== Population ==
Historical population
Year	Pop.	±% p.a.
1968	301	—
1975	193	−6.15%
1982	164	−2.30%
1990	130	−2.86%
1999	131	+0.09%
2007	130	−0.10%
2012	123	−1.10%
2017	120	−0.49%
2023	97	−3.48%
Source: INSEE

== See also ==
- Communes of the Aisne department
