= Iviers =

- Commune
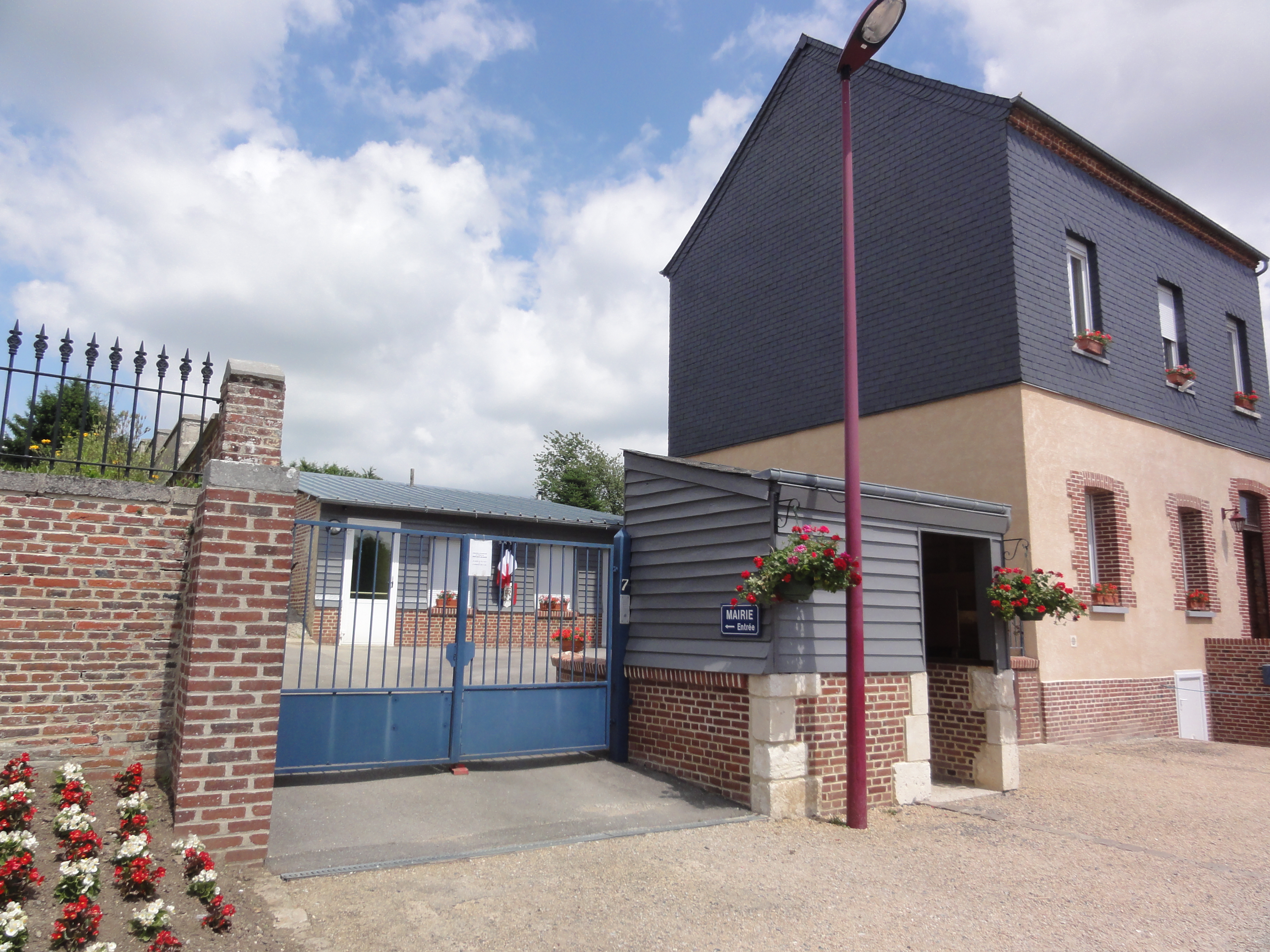
- The town hall of Iviers
- Location of Iviers
- Location within France Location within Hauts-de-France
- Coordinates: 49°47′04″N 4°08′37″E
- Country: France
- Region: Hauts-de-France
- Department: Aisne
- Arrondissement: Vervins
- Canton: Hirson
- Intercommunality: CC Trois Rivières

Government
  - Mayor (2026–32): Laurent Demonceaux
- Area^{1}: 7.45 km^{2} (2.88 sq mi)
- Elevation: 210 m (690 ft)
- Highest elevation: 250 m (820 ft)
- Lowest elevation: 172 m (564 ft)
- Population (2023): 218
  - Density: 29.3/km^{2} (75.8/sq mi)
- Time zone: UTC+01:00 (CET)
  - Summer (DST): UTC+02:00 (CEST)
- INSEE/Postal code: 02388 /02360
- ^{1} French Land Register data, which excludes lakes, ponds, glaciers > 1 km^{2} (0.386 sq mi or 247 acres) and river estuaries.

Iviers (French pronunciation: [ivje]) is a commune in the Aisne department in Hauts-de-France in northern France.

== Population ==
Historical population
Year	Pop.	±% p.a.
1968	265	—
1975	228	−2.13%
1982	210	−1.17%
1990	195	−0.92%
1999	172	−1.38%
2007	169	−0.22%
2012	215	+4.93%
2017	232	+1.53%
2023	218	−1.03%
Source: INSEE

== See also ==
- Communes of the Aisne department
