= Englancourt =

- Commune
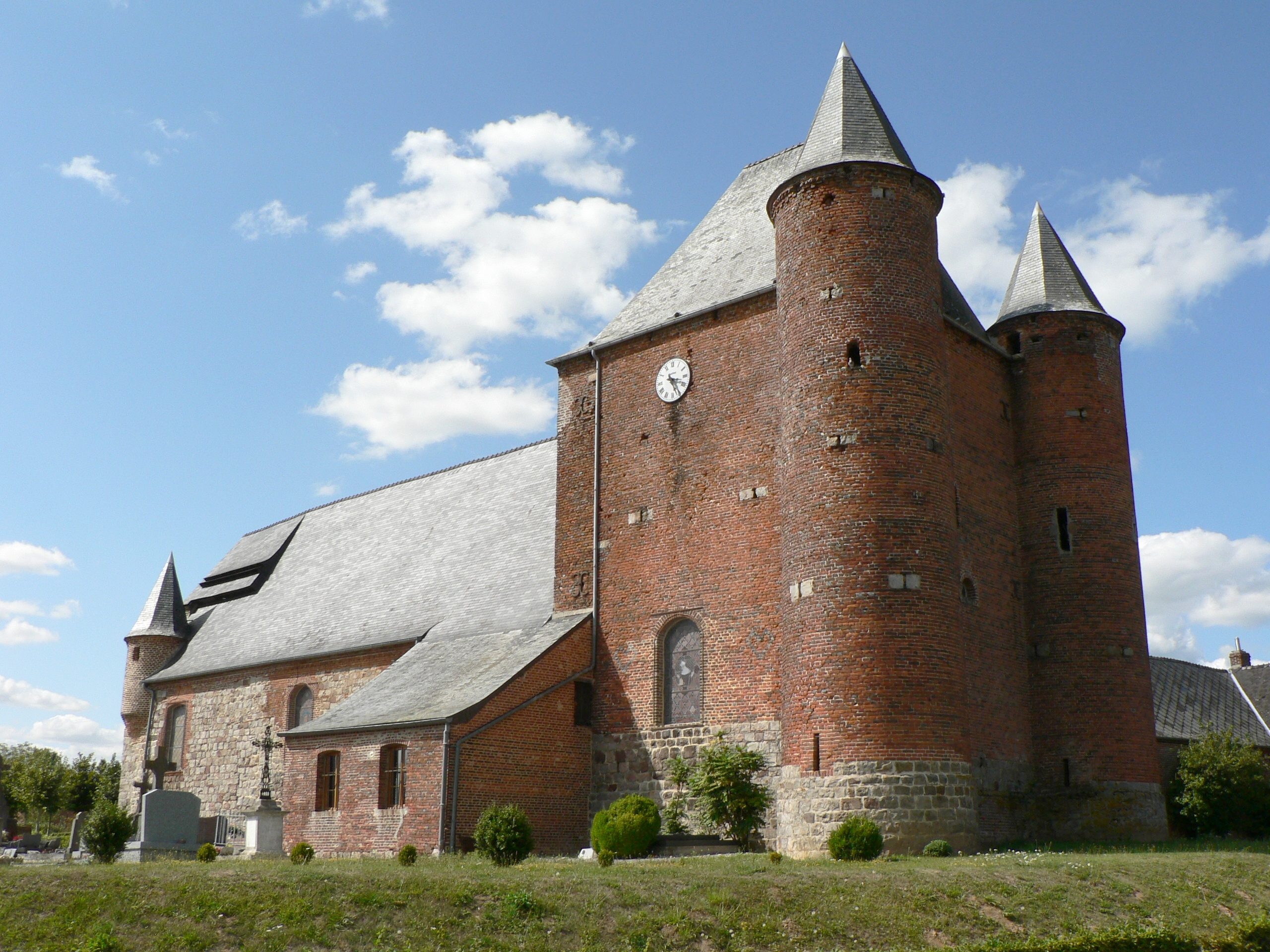
- The fortress church of Englancourt
- Location of Englancourt
- Location within France Location within Hauts-de-France
- Coordinates: 49°55′03″N 3°48′07″E
- Country: France
- Region: Hauts-de-France
- Department: Aisne
- Arrondissement: Vervins
- Canton: Vervins
- Intercommunality: Thiérache du Centre

Government
  - Mayor (2026–32): Daniel Carlier
- Area^{1}: 7.97 km^{2} (3.08 sq mi)
- Elevation: 180 m (590 ft)
- Highest elevation: 207 m (679 ft)
- Lowest elevation: 111 m (364 ft)
- Population (2023): 122
  - Density: 15.3/km^{2} (39.6/sq mi)
- Time zone: UTC+01:00 (CET)
  - Summer (DST): UTC+02:00 (CEST)
- INSEE/Postal code: 02276 /02260
- ^{1} French Land Register data, which excludes lakes, ponds, glaciers > 1 km^{2} (0.386 sq mi or 247 acres) and river estuaries.

Englancourt (French pronunciation: [ɑ̃ɡlɑ̃kuʁ]) is a commune in the Aisne department in Hauts-de-France in northern France.

== Population ==
Historical population
| Year | Pop. | ±% p.a. |
|---|---|---|
| 1968 | 177 | — |
| 1975 | 173 | −0.33% |
| 1982 | 166 | −0.59% |
| 1990 | 109 | −5.12% |
| 1999 | 125 | +1.53% |
| 2007 | 113 | −1.25% |
| 2012 | 132 | +3.16% |
| 2017 | 122 | −1.56% |
| 2023 | 122 | +0.00% |
Source: INSEE

== See also ==
- Communes of the Aisne department
