= La Bouteille =

- Commune
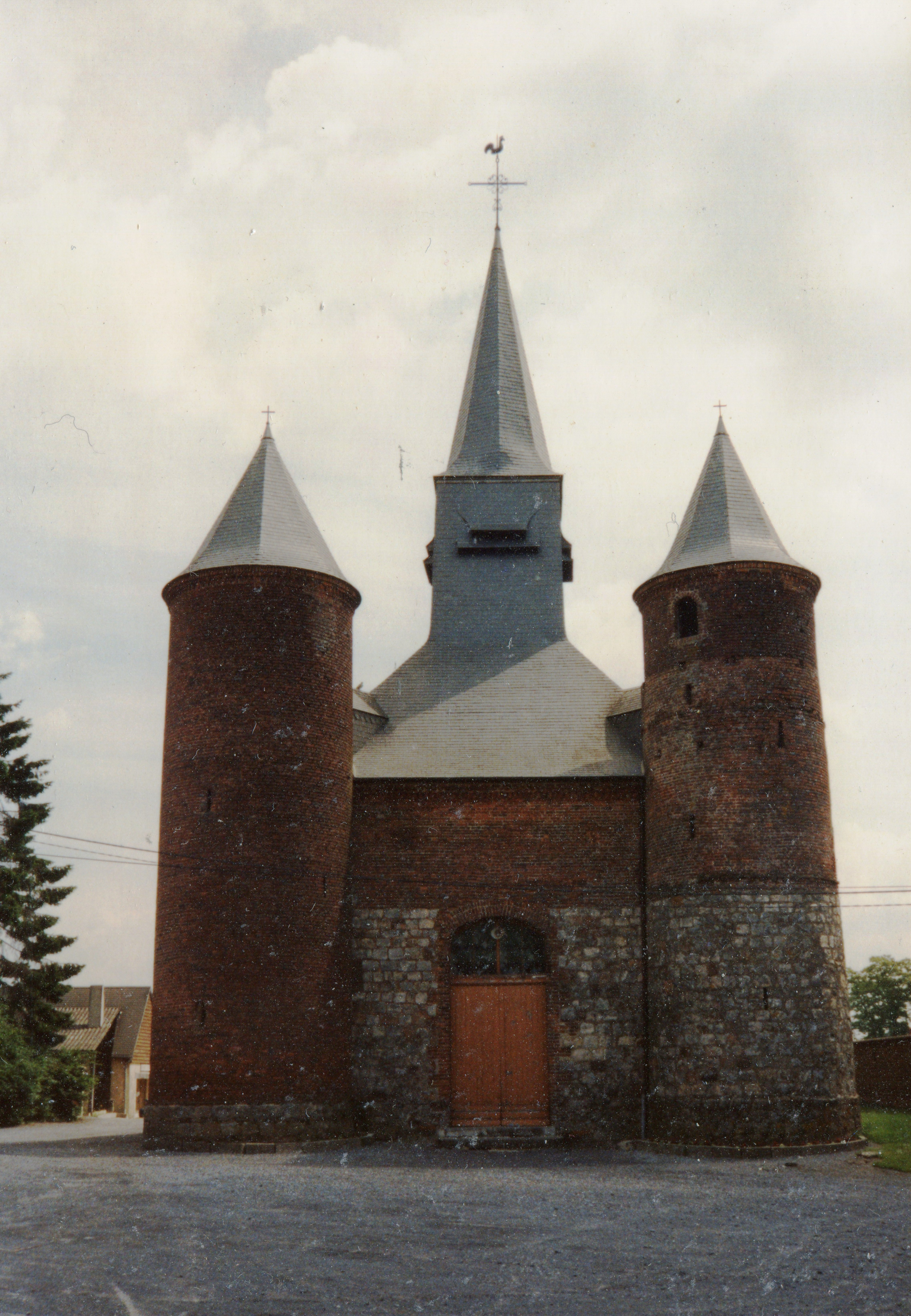
- The church of La Bouteille

- Coat of arms
- Location of La Bouteille
- Location within France Location within Hauts-de-France
- Coordinates: 49°51′37″N 3°58′22″E
- Country: France
- Region: Hauts-de-France
- Department: Aisne
- Arrondissement: Vervins
- Canton: Vervins
- Intercommunality: Thiérache du Centre

Government
  - Mayor (2026–32): Cyrille Stevenot
- Area^{1}: 19 km^{2} (7.3 sq mi)
- Elevation: 214 m (702 ft)
- Highest elevation: 223 m (732 ft)
- Lowest elevation: 125 m (410 ft)
- Population (2023): 464
  - Density: 24/km^{2} (63/sq mi)
- Time zone: UTC+01:00 (CET)
  - Summer (DST): UTC+02:00 (CEST)
- INSEE/Postal code: 02109 /02140
- ^{1} French Land Register data, which excludes lakes, ponds, glaciers > 1 km^{2} (0.386 sq mi or 247 acres) and river estuaries.

La Bouteille (French pronunciation: [la butɛj]) is a commune in the department of Aisne in Hauts-de-France in northern France.

== Population ==
Historical population
Year	Pop.	±% p.a.
1968	633	—
1975	549	−2.01%
1982	514	−0.94%
1990	502	−0.29%
1999	508	+0.13%
2007	512	+0.10%
2012	498	−0.55%
2017	486	−0.49%
2023	464	−0.77%
Source: INSEE

== See also ==
- Communes of the Aisne department
