= Vigneux-Hocquet =

- Commune
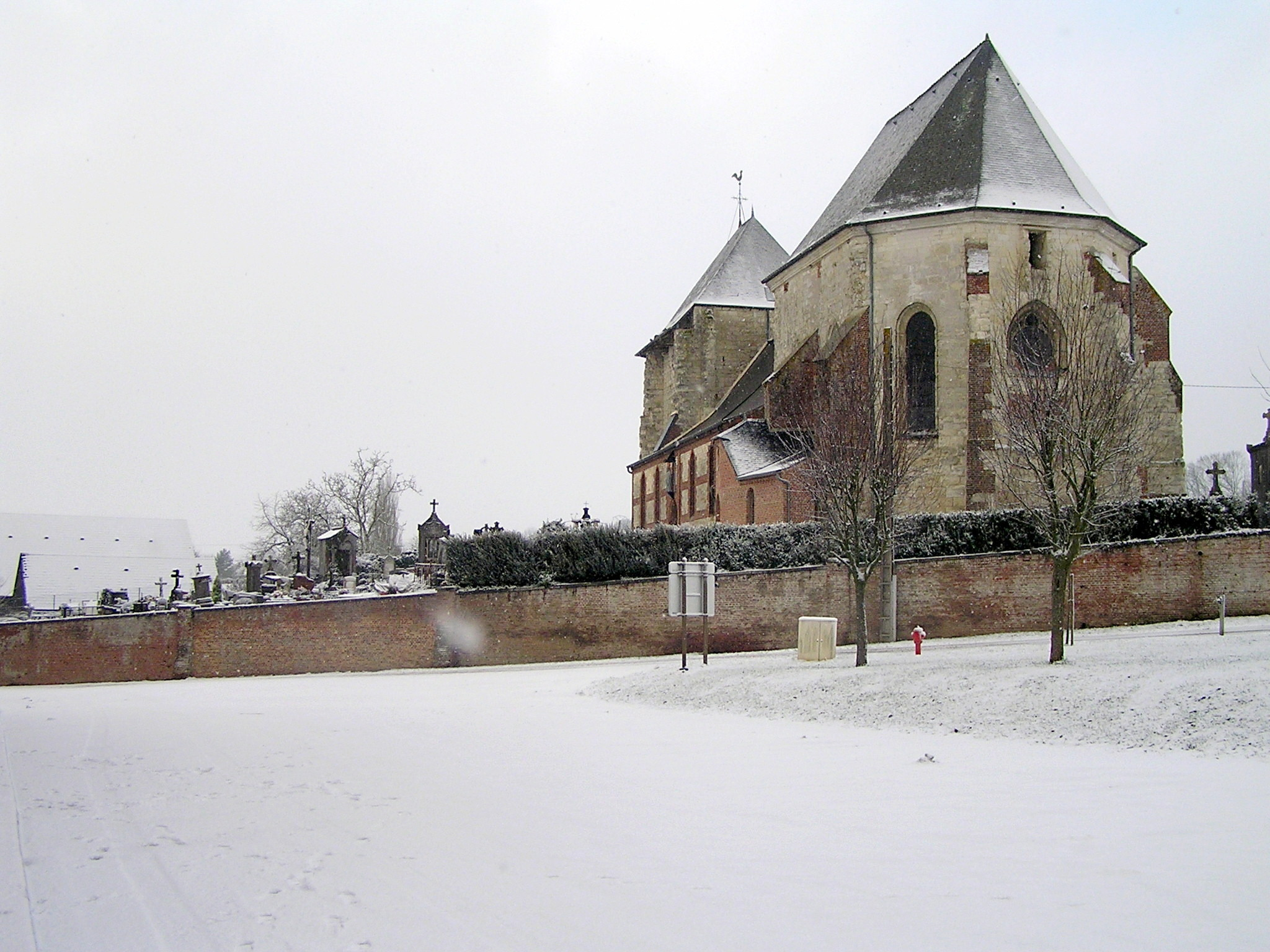
- The church of Vigneux-Hocquet
- Location of Vigneux-Hocquet
- Location within France Location within Hauts-de-France
- Coordinates: 49°44′20″N 3°59′28″E
- Country: France
- Region: Hauts-de-France
- Department: Aisne
- Arrondissement: Vervins
- Canton: Vervins
- Intercommunality: Portes de la Thiérache

Government
  - Mayor (2026–32): Francine Leturque
- Area^{1}: 13.72 km^{2} (5.30 sq mi)
- Elevation: 140 m (460 ft)
- Highest elevation: 201 m (659 ft)
- Lowest elevation: 116 m (381 ft)
- Population (2023): 262
  - Density: 19.1/km^{2} (49.5/sq mi)
- Time zone: UTC+01:00 (CET)
  - Summer (DST): UTC+02:00 (CEST)
- INSEE/Postal code: 02801 /02340
- ^{1} French Land Register data, which excludes lakes, ponds, glaciers > 1 km^{2} (0.386 sq mi or 247 acres) and river estuaries.

Vigneux-Hocquet (French pronunciation: [viɲø ɔkɛ]) is a commune in the Aisne department in Hauts-de-France in northern France.

== Population ==
Historical population
Year	Pop.	±% p.a.
1968	440	—
1975	391	−1.67%
1982	342	−1.89%
1990	297	−1.75%
1999	265	−1.26%
2007	278	+0.60%
2012	279	+0.07%
2017	268	−0.80%
2023	262	−0.38%
Source: INSEE

== See also ==
- Communes of the Aisne department
