= Dizy-le-Gros =

- Commune
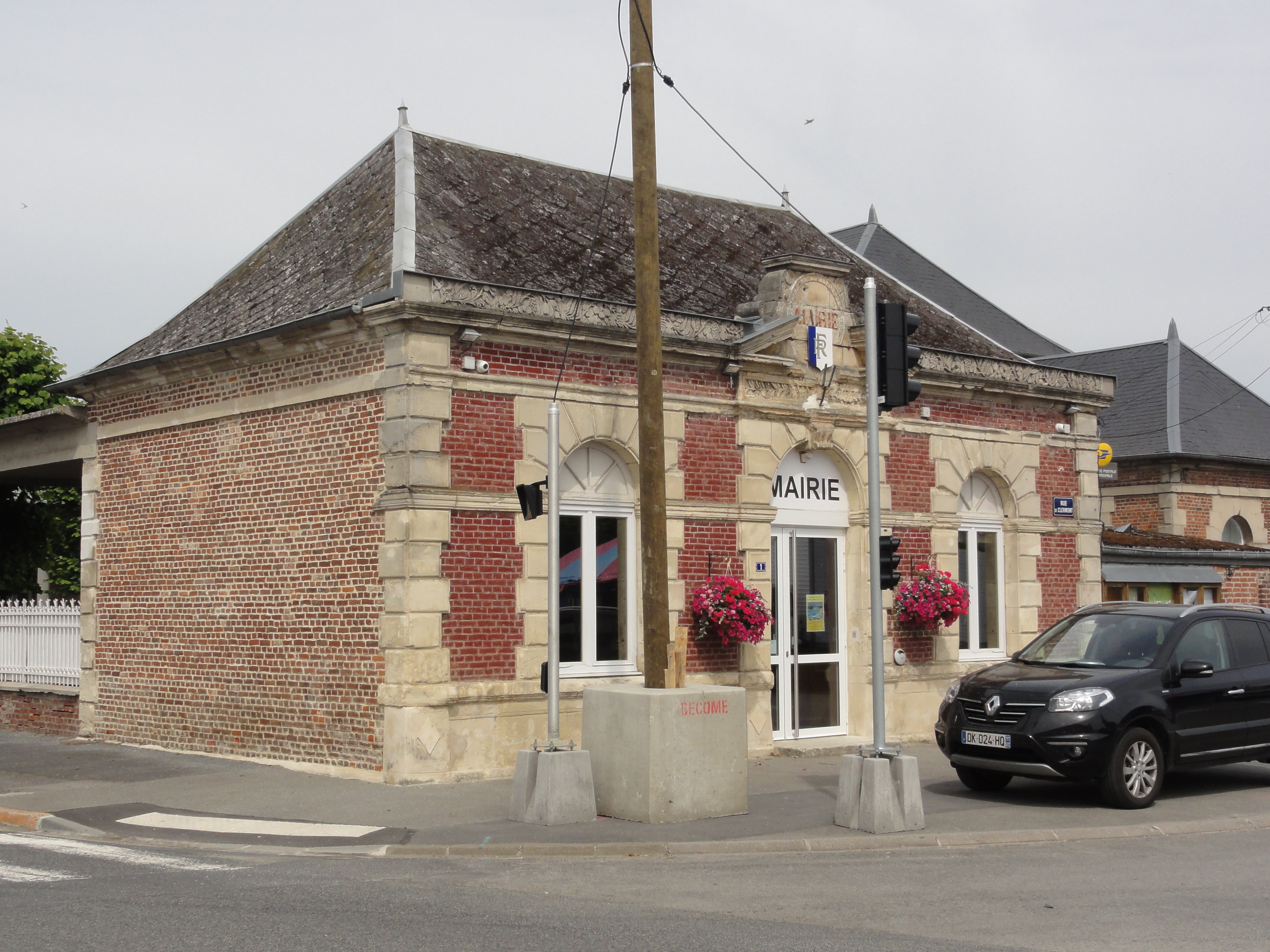
- The town hall of Dizy-le-Gros

- Coat of arms
- Location of Dizy-le-Gros
- Location within France Location within Hauts-de-France
- Coordinates: 49°37′48″N 4°01′23″E
- Country: France
- Region: Hauts-de-France
- Department: Aisne
- Arrondissement: Vervins
- Canton: Vervins
- Intercommunality: Portes de la Thiérache

Government
  - Mayor (2026–32): Martin Appert
- Area^{1}: 19.96 km^{2} (7.71 sq mi)
- Elevation: 137 m (449 ft)
- Highest elevation: 162 m (531 ft)
- Lowest elevation: 92 m (302 ft)
- Population (2023): 717
  - Density: 35.9/km^{2} (93.0/sq mi)
- Time zone: UTC+01:00 (CET)
  - Summer (DST): UTC+02:00 (CEST)
- INSEE/Postal code: 02264 /02340
- ^{1} French Land Register data, which excludes lakes, ponds, glaciers > 1 km^{2} (0.386 sq mi or 247 acres) and river estuaries.

Dizy-le-Gros (French pronunciation: [dizi lə ɡʁo]) is a commune in the Aisne department in Hauts-de-France in northern France.

== Population ==
Historical population
Year	Pop.	±% p.a.
1968	1,032	—
1975	854	−2.67%
1982	829	−0.42%
1990	762	−1.05%
1999	755	−0.10%
2007	773	+0.29%
2012	782	+0.23%
2017	747	−0.91%
2023	717	−0.68%
Source: INSEE

== See also ==
- Communes of the Aisne department
