= Canton of Aubenton =

Coordinates: 49°49′N 4°12′E

Aubenton
- Former canton
- Interactive map of Aubenton
- Country: France
- Region: Hauts-de-France
- Department: Aisne
- No. of communes: {{{nbcomm}}}
- Disbanded: 2015
- Area: 156.86 km^{2} (60.56 sq mi)
- Population (2012): 3,299
  - Density: 21.03/km^{2} (54.47/sq mi)

The canton of Aubenton is a former administrative division in northern France. It was disbanded following the French canton reorganisation which came into effect in March 2015. It consisted of 13 communes, which joined the canton of Hirson in 2015. It had 3,299 inhabitants (2012).

The canton comprised the following communes:

- Any-Martin-Rieux
- Aubenton
- Beaumé
- Besmont
- Coingt
- Iviers
- Jeantes
- Landouzy-la-Ville
- Leuze
- Logny-lès-Aubenton
- Martigny
- Mont-Saint-Jean
- Saint-Clément

== Demographics ==
Historical population Canton of Aubenton
Year	1962	1968	1975	1982	1990	1999
Pop.	4,081	4,448	3,916	3,666	3,608	3,309
±%	—	+9.0%	−12.0%	−6.4%	−1.6%	−8.3%
From the year 1962 on: No double counting – residents of multiple communes (e.g. students and military personnel) are counted only once. Source: INSEE

== See also ==
- Cantons of the Aisne department

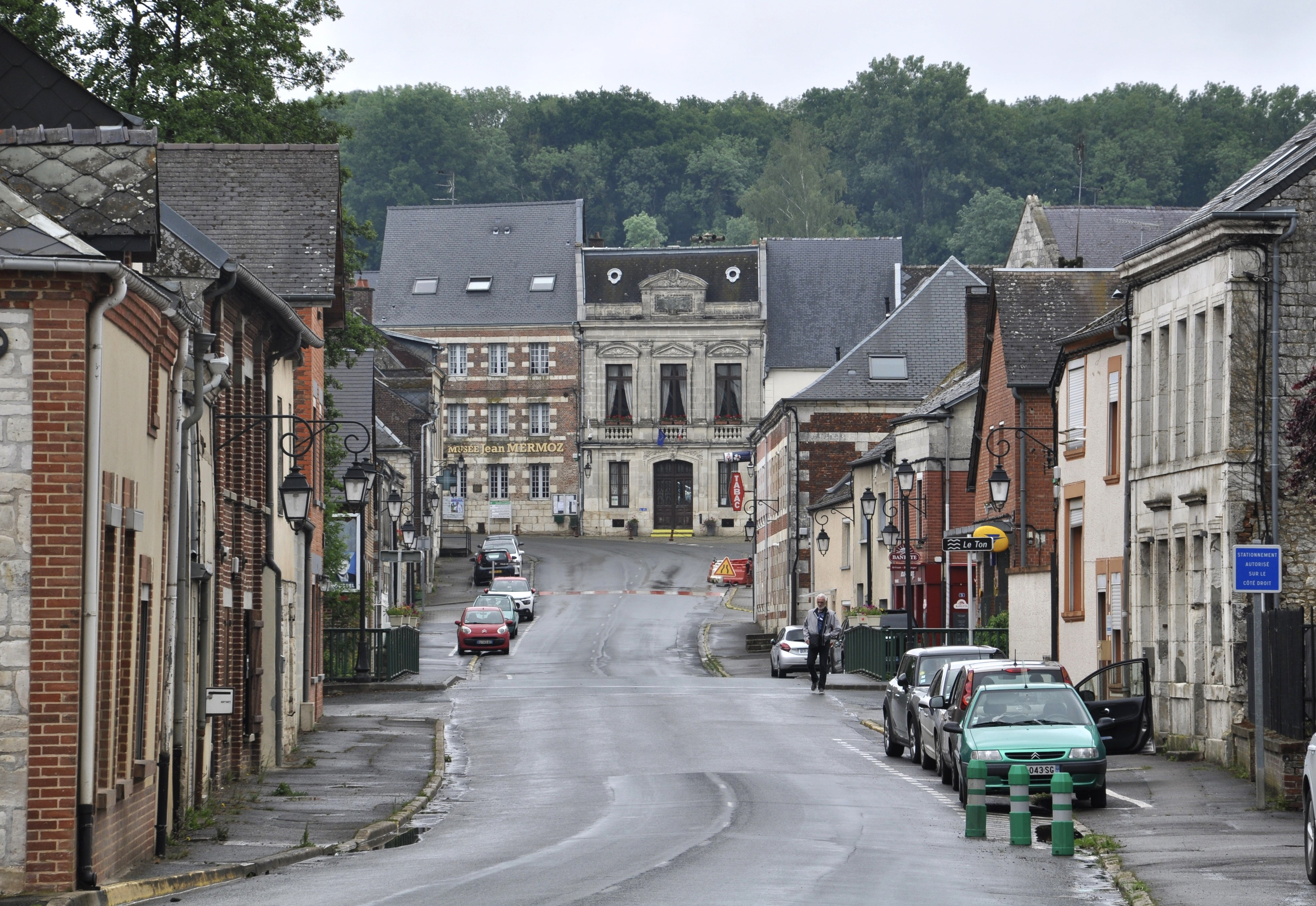
Aubenton, 'capital' of the former canton
