= Landouzy =

Landouzy may refer to:

== People ==
- Louis Théophile Joseph Landouzy, French neurologist

== Places ==
France

- Landouzy-la-Cour, commune in the Aisne department
- Landouzy-la-Ville, commune in the Aisne department

== See also ==
- Facioscapulohumeral muscular dystrophy, originally called Landouzy-Dejerine
