= Communauté de communes des Trois Rivières, Aisne =

Federation of municipalities in France

Coordinates: 49.90°N 4.06°E

Trois Rivières
- Communauté de communes
- Location within the department
- Country: France
- Region: Hauts-de-France
- Department: Aisne
- No. of communes: {{{nbcomm}}}
- Established: 29 December 1995

Government
  - President: Jean-Jacques Thomas
- Area: 349.19 km^{2} (134.82 sq mi)
- Population (2023): 20,346
  - Density: 58.266/km^{2} (150.91/sq mi)
- Website: www.cc-paystroisrivieres.fr

The Communauté de communes des Trois Rivières (CC3R) (before January 2017: Communauté de communes du Pays des Trois Rivières) is a federation of municipalities (communauté de communes) in the Aisne département and in the Hauts-de-France region of France. Since June 2016, its seat is in Buire. Its area is 349.2 km^{2}, and its population was 21,171 in 2018, of which 8,800 in Hirson, the most populous commune.

== Composition ==
Composition of the Communauté de communes du Pays des Rivières.

The Communauté de communes des Trois Rivières includes 26 communes:

List of communes of the Communauté de communes du Pays des Rivières
| Commune | Code INSEE | Demonym | Area (km^{2}) | Population (2017) | Density (per km^{2}) |
|---|---|---|---|---|---|
| Buire (seat) | 02134 | Buirois | 4.13 | 869 | 210 |
| Any-Martin-Rieux | 02020 | Arnésiens | 17.73 | 456 | 26 |
| Aubenton | 02031 | Aubentonnais | 23.7 | 657 | 28 |
| Beaumé | 02055 | Beauméens | 9.18 | 92 | 10 |
| Besmont | 02079 | Besmontois | 15.86 | 152 | 9.6 |
| Bucilly | 02130 | Bucillois | 12.85 | 193 | 15 |
| Coingt | 02204 | Coingtois | 7.31 | 68 | 9.3 |
| Effry | 02275 | Effryens | 2.77 | 324 | 117 |
| Éparcy | 02278 | Éparcyacois | 7.52 | 30 | 4 |
| Hirson | 02381 | Hirsonnais | 33.77 | 8,813 | 261 |
| Iviers | 02388 | Iviérois | 7.45 | 232 | 31 |
| Jeantes | 02391 | Jeantais | 15.61 | 205 | 13 |
| La Hérie | 02378 | Hériens | 4.22 | 143 | 34 |
| Landouzy-la-Ville | 02405 | Landouziens | 15.76 | 541 | 34 |
| Leuze | 02425 | Leuzois | 10.19 | 173 | 17 |
| Logny-lès-Aubenton | 02435 | Lognynais | 8.15 | 74 | 9.1 |
| Martigny | 02470 | Martignyais | 16.96 | 434 | 26 |
| Mondrepuis | 02495 | Mondrepuisiens | 20.33 | 1,040 | 51 |
| Mont-Saint-Jean | 02522 | Mont-Saint-Jeannais | 3.97 | 75 | 19 |
| Neuve-Maison | 02544 | Neuve-Maisonnais | 8.42 | 611 | 73 |
| Ohis | 02567 | Ohissois | 6.48 | 303 | 47 |
| Origny-en-Thiérache | 02574 | Auriniens | 16.48 | 1,453 | 88 |
| Saint-Clément | 02674 | Clémentins | 5.01 | 50 | 10 |
| Saint-Michel | 02684 | Saint-Michelois | 42.2 | 3,417 | 81 |
| Watigny | 02831 | Watignyens | 21.12 | 379 | 18 |
| Wimy | 02833 | Wimyens | 12.04 | 487 | 40 |

== Demographics ==
Historical population
| Year | Pop. | ±% p.a. |
|---|---|---|
| 1968 | 27,513 | — |
| 1975 | 26,227 | −0.68% |
| 1982 | 25,187 | −0.58% |
| 1990 | 23,757 | −0.73% |
| 1999 | 23,206 | −0.26% |
| 2007 | 22,204 | −0.55% |
| 2012 | 22,100 | −0.09% |
| 2017 | 21,271 | −0.76% |
| 2023 | 20,346 | −0.74% |
Geographical reference 1 January 2025. Source: INSEE

== Organization ==
=== Administrative seat ===
The administrative seat of the communauté de communes was originally located in Saint-Michel. On 3 June 2016, the seat was moved to Buire as the result of an administrative order.

=== Elected members ===
The CC3R is administered by a conseil communautaire, composed of 60 members from 2014 to 2020 and 52 members since the 2020 municipal election. The number of council seats each commune receives is proportional based upon their population as follows:

- 18 delegates for Hirson.
- 7 delegates for Saint-Michel.
- 3 delegates for Origny-en-Thiérache.
- 2 delegates for Mondrepuis.
- 1 delegate for each remaining 22 communes.

=== President ===
List of successive presidents of the Communauté de communes des Trois Rivières
| In office | | President | Party | Capacity | Ref. |
|---|---|---|---|---|---|
| ? | present | Jean-Jacques Thomas | PS | Mayor of Hirson (1995–present) General councilor for the canton of Hirson (1998–2015) Vice-president of the departmental council of Aisne (2008–2015) | |

Additionally the president of the CC3R is assisted by 7 vice-presidents, each with their own portfolios and a bureau de l'intercommunalité composed of 6 additional members.

== See also ==
- Communes of the Aisne department
