= Any-Martin-Rieux =

- Commune
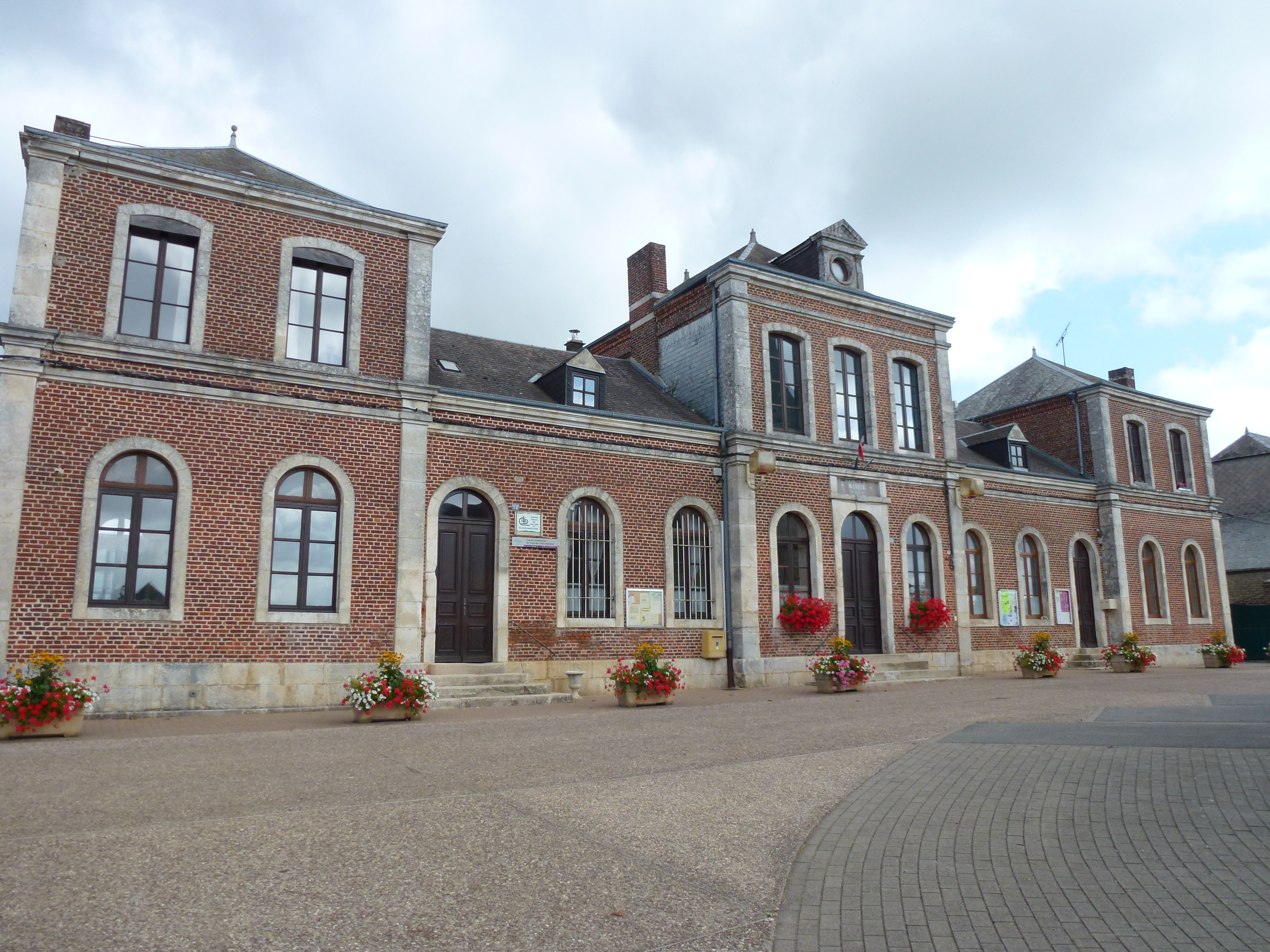
- Town hall

- Coat of arms
- Location of Any-Martin-Rieux
- Location within France Location within Hauts-de-France
- Coordinates: 49°52′55″N 4°13′18″E
- Country: France
- Region: Hauts-de-France
- Department: Aisne
- Arrondissement: Vervins
- Canton: Hirson
- Intercommunality: Trois Rivières

Government
  - Mayor (2026–32): Ghislain Vandersypt
- Area^{1}: 17.73 km^{2} (6.85 sq mi)
- Elevation: 207 m (679 ft)
- Highest elevation: 266 m (873 ft)
- Lowest elevation: 197 m (646 ft)
- Population (2023): 456
  - Density: 25.7/km^{2} (66.6/sq mi)
- Time zone: UTC+01:00 (CET)
  - Summer (DST): UTC+02:00 (CEST)
- INSEE/Postal code: 02020 /02500
- ^{1} French Land Register data, which excludes lakes, ponds, glaciers > 1 km^{2} (0.386 sq mi or 247 acres) and river estuaries.

Any-Martin-Rieux is a commune in the department of Aisne in the Hauts-de-France region of northern France.

== Geography ==
The village was formerly known as Thiérache and was built on the edge of a stream. It is located 40 km northeast of Charleville-Mézières, 10 km southeast of Hirson, and about 8 km south of the Belgian frontier. The commune can be accessed by the D1043 (E44) road which passes through the southern part of the commune from Hirson in the west to Maubert-Fontaine in the east. The D5 road comes from Aubenton in the south intersecting the D1043 at the hamlet of Bellevue in the commune and continuing north to the village then on to Neuville-aux-Joutes. the D31 road from Saint-Michel in the west to Signy-le-Petit passes through the northern tip of the commune. The D134 road also goes from the village east through the hamlet of Martin-Rieux to Fligny. There are a few hamlets and villages in the commune: La Malaise, Martin-Rieux, La Rue du Moulin, Housseau, and Bellevue. The commune is mostly farmland but with a large area of forest in the northeast.

Le Petit Gland river flows west through the commune with a network of tributaries feeding it including the Ruisseau des Sourdrons from the south and the Ruisseau de Laubry from the north. Le Petit Gland flows west to join the Gland river near Saint-Michel.

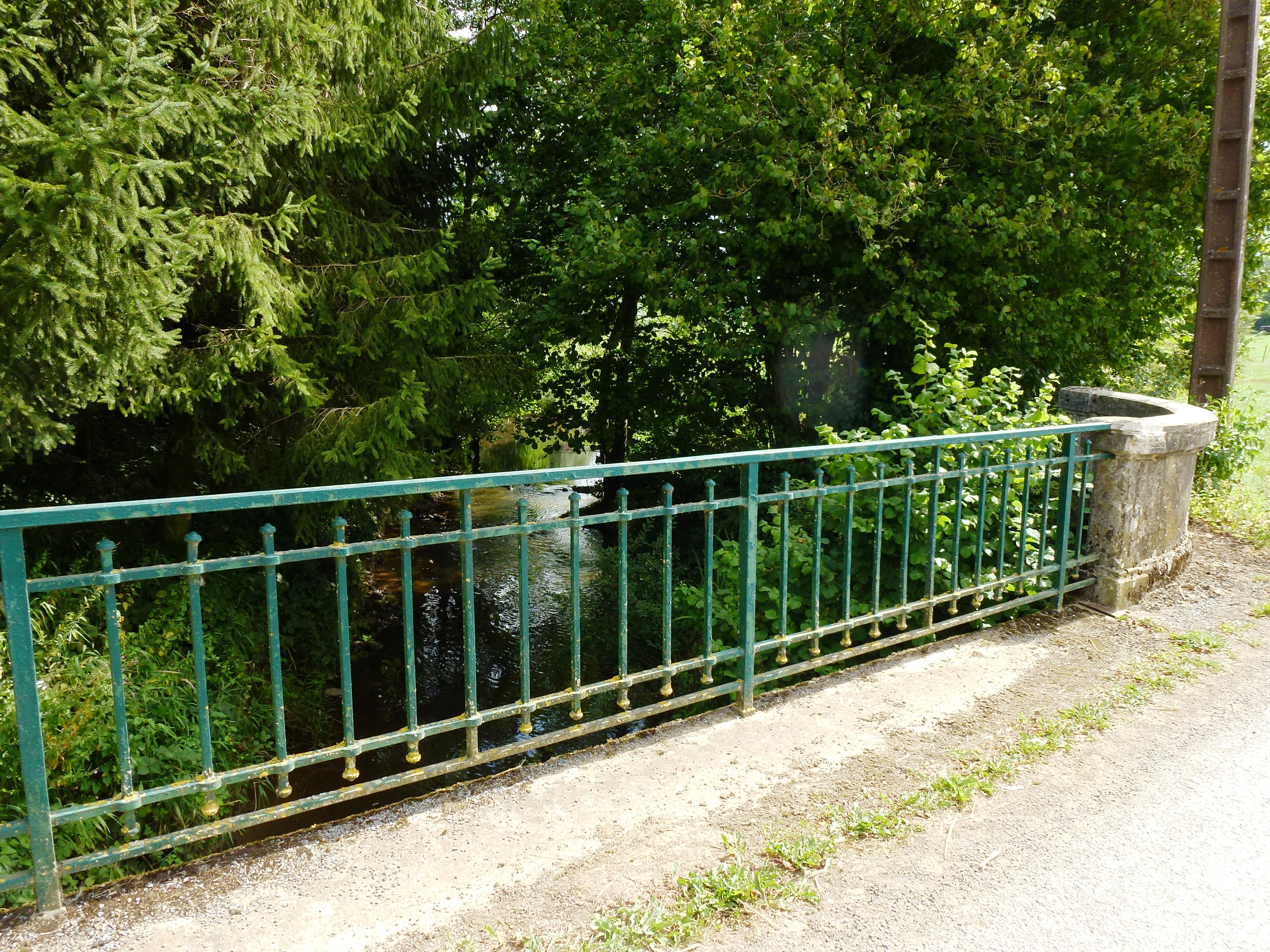
Le Petit Gland

== History ==
Any or Anies (Martin-Rieux) was called Aneia in 646, Ania in 1218 and under the Ancien Régime was formerly part of the "généralité" of the town of Soissons and the bailiwick and electorate of the town of Guise (diocese of Laon). Today it is part of the Canton of Hirson, arrondissement of Vervins, in the Diocese of Soissons.

The Patron Saint is Saint Médard.

Any was once the capital of a lordship. There is mention of this village in the miracles of Saint Thierry, who lived in the 11th century. He called it "villa" and indicated it as being placed in the middle of the forest of Thiérache in the 11th century. Any was owned by Irmine, the daughter of Dagobert II, king of France. In 676 she gave the territory to de Trèves, the Abbot of Oeren, for the cure of her soul and that of her husband, Count Herman. The abbots of Saint-Laurent de Joinville had formerly owned a tax free estate at Any, said to be one of the oldest in the kingdom.

== Administration ==
List of Successive Mayors of Any-Martin-Rieux

From	To	Name	Party
2001	2006	Charles Kloppenburg	SE
2006	2020	Prince Maillard	
2020	2026	Carine Van Der Sypt	
2026	incumbent	Ghislain Vandersypt	

== Population ==
Historical population
Year	Pop.	±% p.a.
1968	631	—
1975	559	−1.72%
1982	498	−1.64%
1990	525	+0.66%
1999	505	−0.43%
2007	510	+0.12%
2012	467	−1.75%
2017	456	−0.48%
2023	456	+0.00%
Source: INSEE

== Culture and heritage ==
=== Civil heritage ===
The commune has a large number of buildings and structures that are registered as historical monuments:

- The Gobert-Pasté House at 13 Rue du 11-Novembre (19th century)
- An old Manor at 5 Rue du 11-Novembre (1666)
- An old Fortified Chateau (12th century)
- A Farmhouse at 1 Rue de l'Eglise (18th century)
- The Communal Schools and Town Hall at 15 Rue de l'Eglise (1862)
- A Farmhouse at 16 Rue de l'Eglise (18th century)
- A Farmhouse at 23 Rue de l'Eglise (18th century)
- A Farmhouse at 5 Rue de l'Eglise (18th century)
- A House at 3-5 Rue des Fontaines (17th century)
- An old Travellers Hotel at 6 Place de la Gare (19th century)
- A Blacksmith-farrier Farmhouse at 12 Rue de la Halle (1827)
- A Farmhouse at 15 Rue de la Halle (18th century)
- A Farmhouse at 11 Rue de Martin-Rieux (18th century)
- A Farmhouse at 2 Rue de Martin-Rieux (19th century)
- A Farmhouse at 25 Rue de Martin-Rieux (18th century)
- A Farmhouse at 7 Rue de Martin-Rieux (1819)
- A Farmhouse at 9 Rue de Martin-Rieux (18th century)
- An old Flour Mill at 15 Rue du Moulin (1733)
- An old Fortified Farmhouse at 16 Rue du Moulin (17th century)
- A Farmhouse at 8 Rue du Moulin (18th century)
- A Farmhouse at 4 Rue du Moulin (19th century)
- A Farmhouse at 10 Sabat rural road (1829)
- A Farmhouse at 13 Bellevue (19th century)
- A Farmhouse at 7 Bellevue (20th century)
- Houses and Farms (17th-20th centuries)

=== Religious heritage ===
The commune has many religious buildings and structures that are registered as historical monuments:

- The Bouvart Family Chapel Tomb (1890)
- The Liot Family Tomb (19th century)
- The Adèle Bouvart Tomb (1884)
- A Funeral Cross (19th century)
- The Maximilien Leden Tomb (1884)
- The Edmond Rope Tomb (1880)
- A Funeral Cross (19th century)
- The Madame Turquin Tomb (1883)
- The Cemetery (19th century)
- The Legras-My and Legras-Lefort Funeral Enclosure (1871)
- The Fortified Church of Saint-Médard and its cemetery (12th century). The Church contains a large number of items that are registered as historical objects.
- A Wayside Cross at Rue de la Halle (1894)
- An Oratory of Notre-Dame of Lourdes at Rue des Joncquois (1894)
- An Oratory at La Folie (19th century)

== Picture Gallery ==
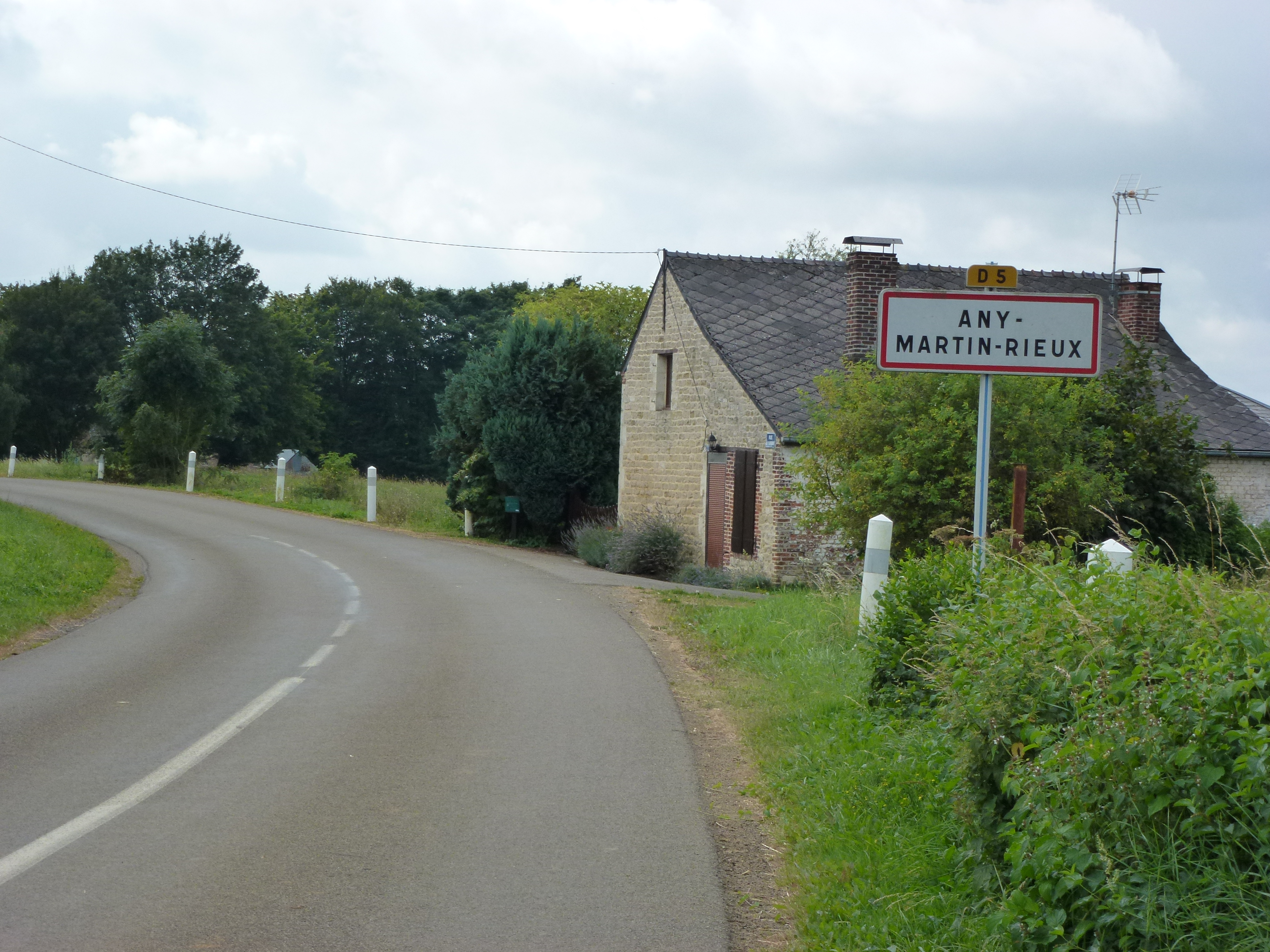
Entry to Any

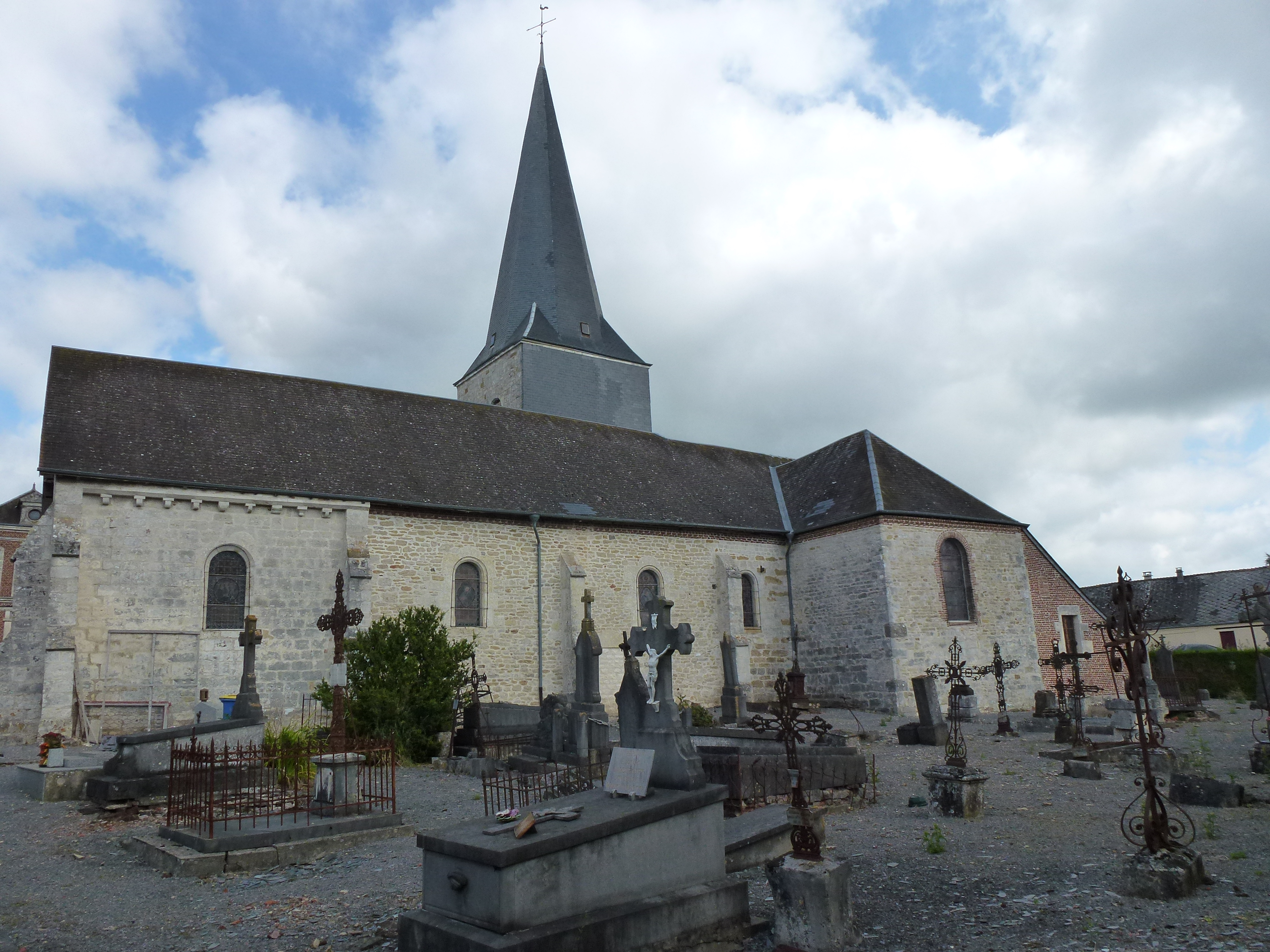
The Church of Any

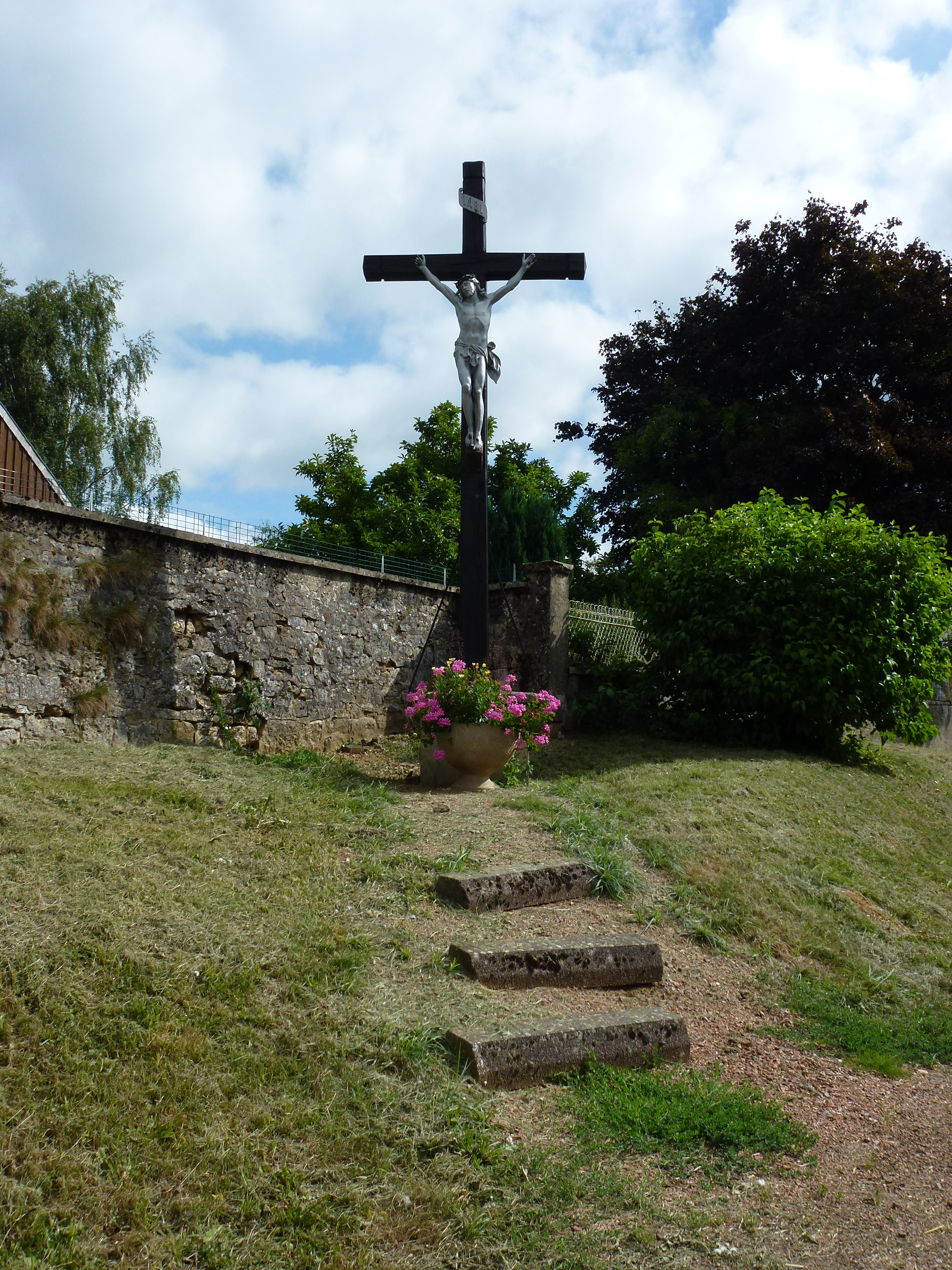
A Cross at Any

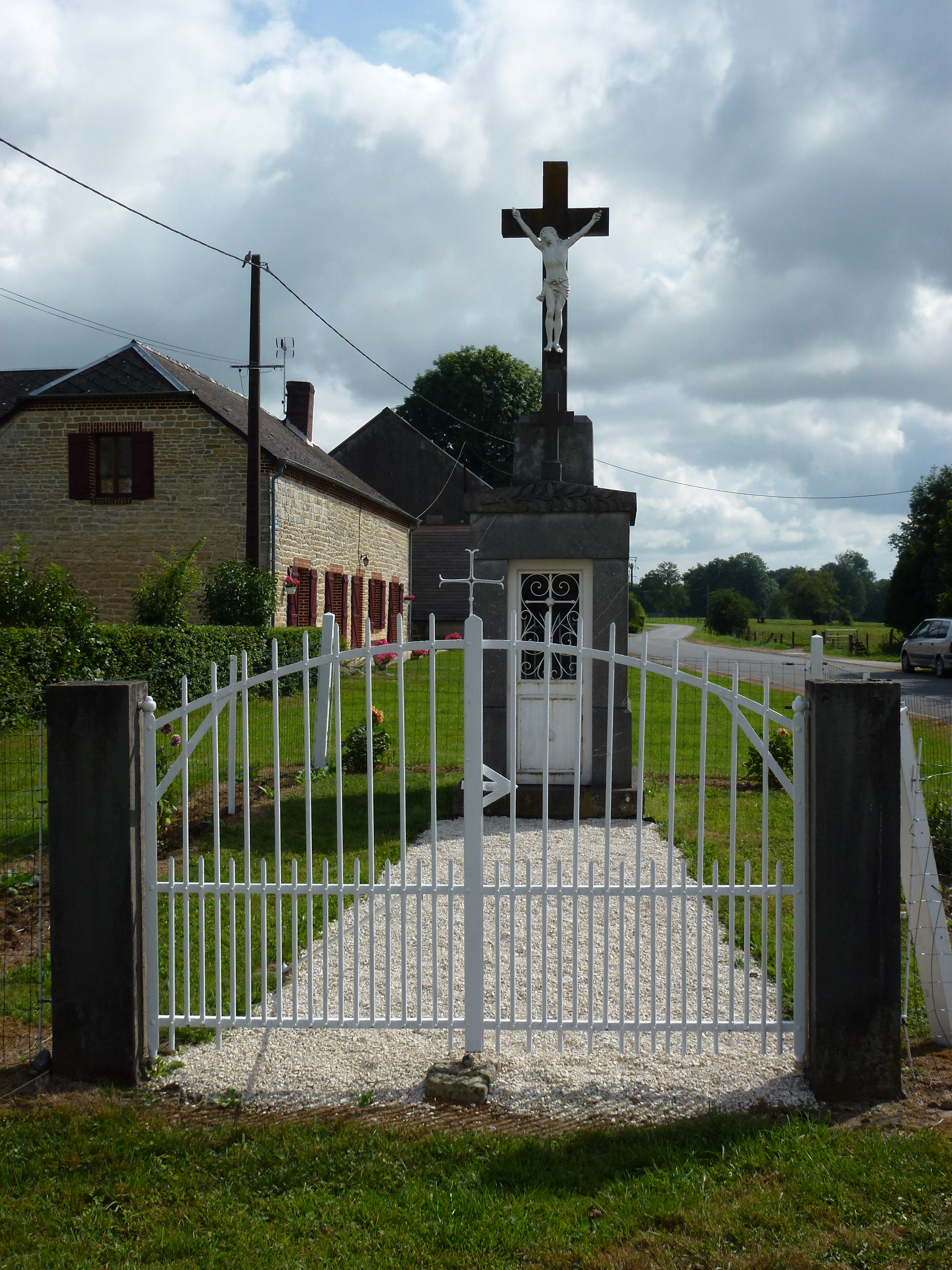
The Oratory at Any

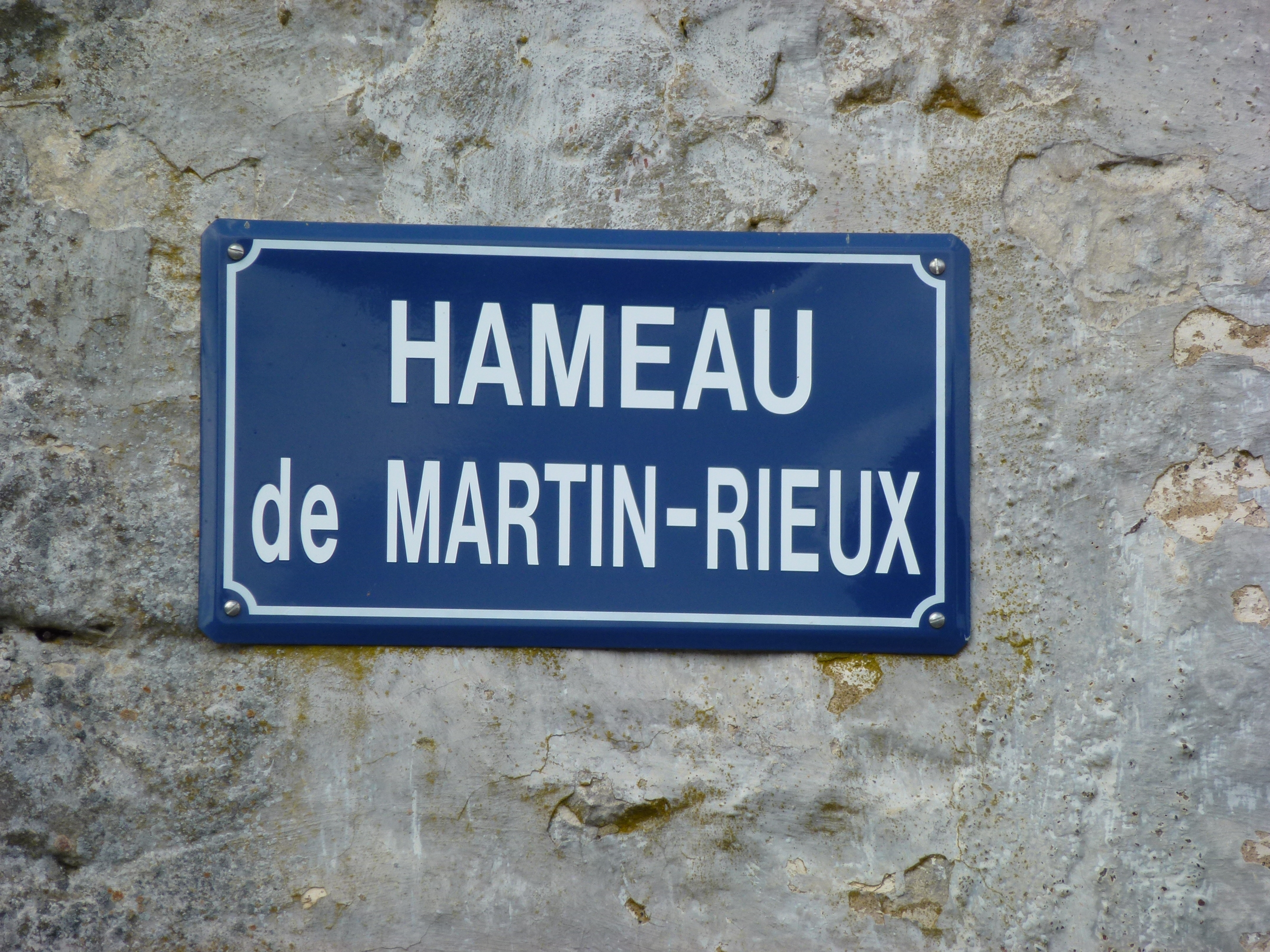
Sign for the Hamlet of Martin-Rieux

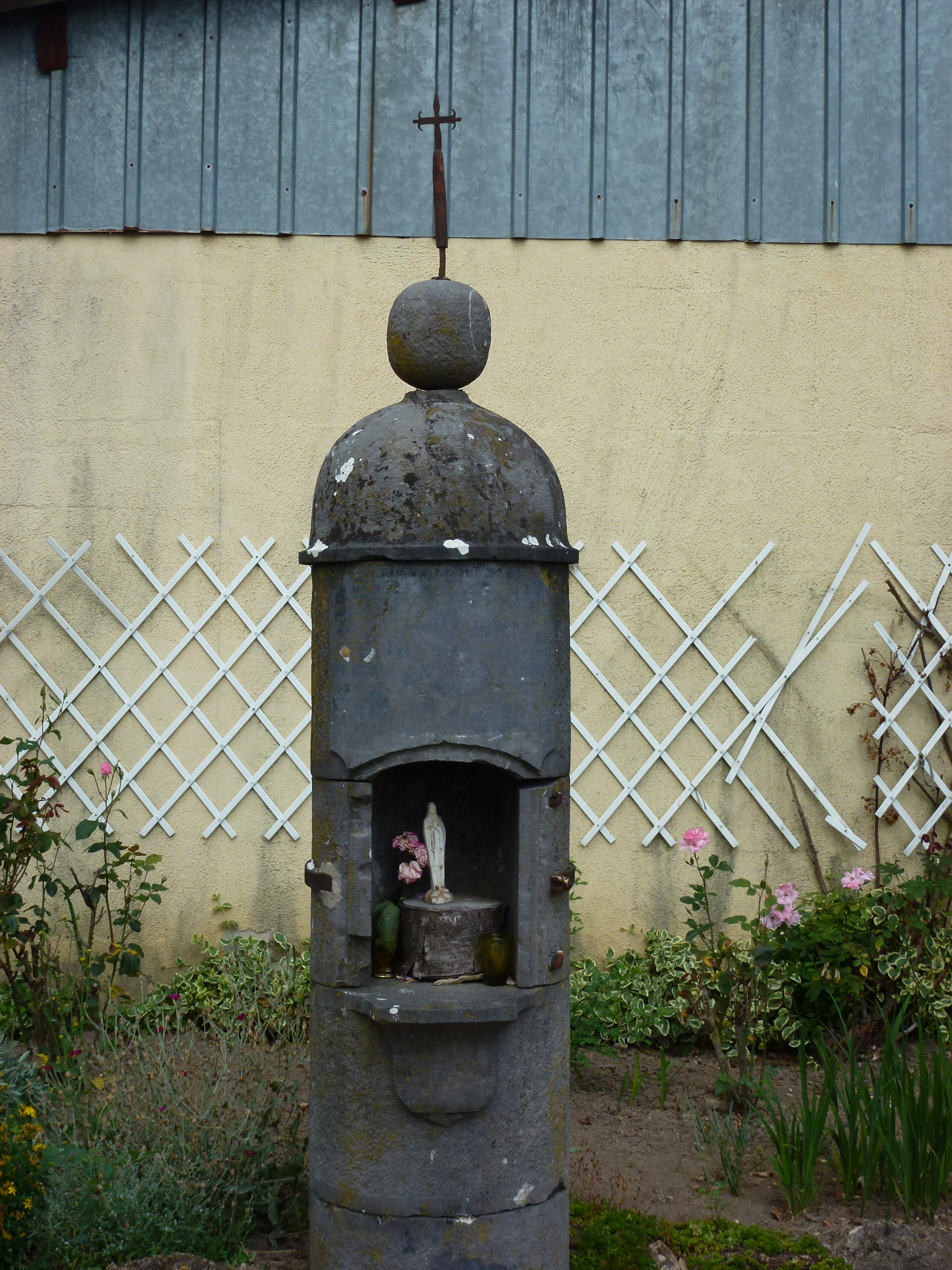
Oratory at Martin-Rieux

== See also ==
- Communes of the Aisne department
- Rio (disambiguation)
- Ríos (disambiguation)
