= Buire =

- Commune
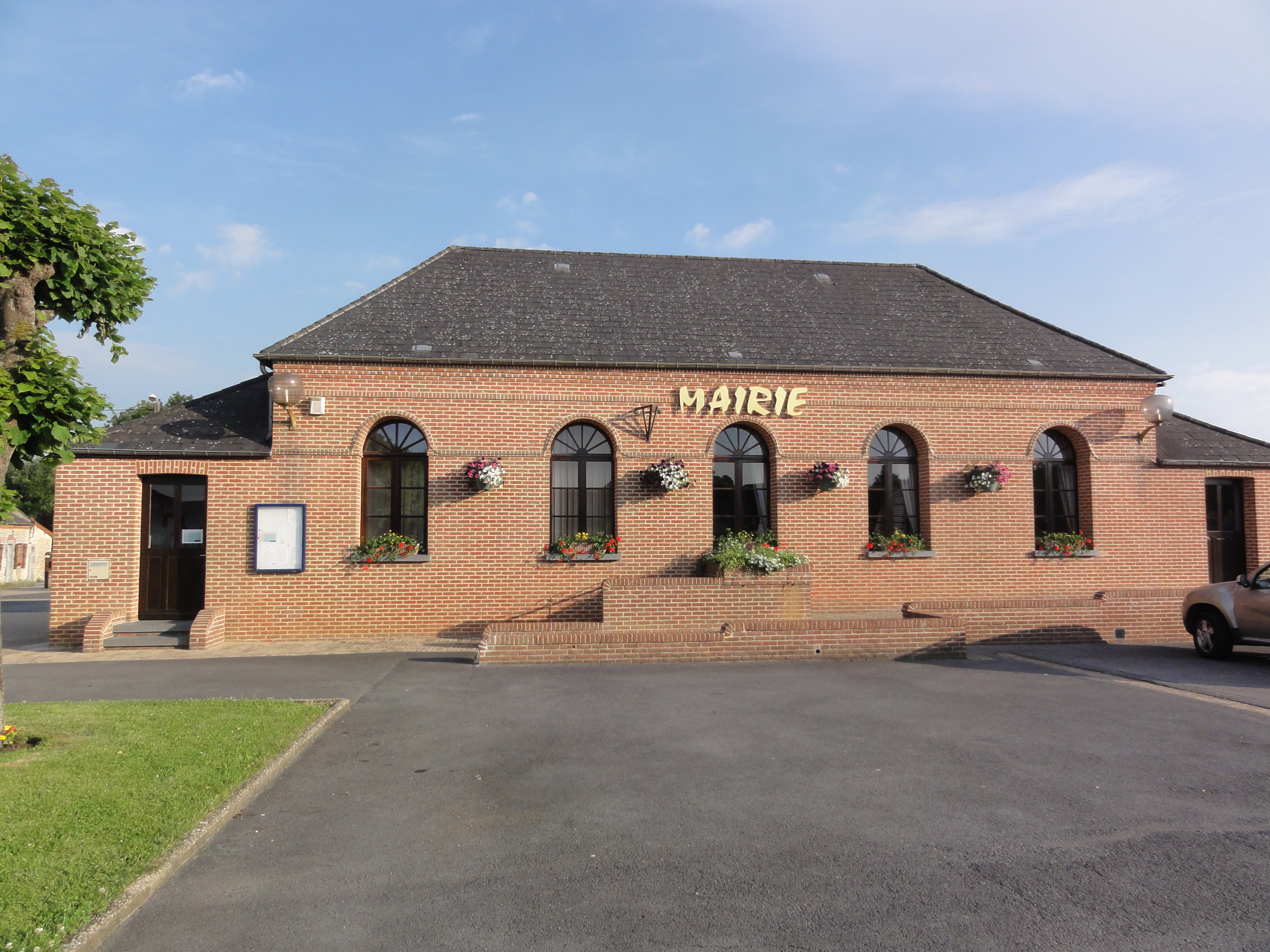
- The town hall of Buire

- Coat of arms
- Location of Buire
- Location within France Location within Hauts-de-France
- Coordinates: 49°54′10″N 4°03′23″E
- Country: France
- Region: Hauts-de-France
- Department: Aisne
- Arrondissement: Vervins
- Canton: Hirson
- Intercommunality: CC Trois Rivières

Government
  - Mayor (2026–32): Pascal Lecerf
- Area^{1}: 4.13 km^{2} (1.59 sq mi)
- Elevation: 142 m (466 ft)
- Highest elevation: 159 m (522 ft)
- Lowest elevation: 203 m (666 ft)
- Population (2023): 795
  - Density: 192/km^{2} (499/sq mi)
- Time zone: UTC+01:00 (CET)
  - Summer (DST): UTC+02:00 (CEST)
- INSEE/Postal code: 02134 /02500
- ^{1} French Land Register data, which excludes lakes, ponds, glaciers > 1 km^{2} (0.386 sq mi or 247 acres) and river estuaries.

Buire (French pronunciation: [bɥiʁ]) is a commune in the department of Aisne in Hauts-de-France in northern France.

== Population ==
Historical population
Year	Pop.	±% p.a.
1968	911	—
1975	785	−2.10%
1982	857	+1.26%
1990	868	+0.16%
1999	892	+0.30%
2007	877	−0.21%
2012	880	+0.07%
2017	869	−0.25%
2023	795	−1.47%
Source: INSEE

== See also ==
- Communes of the Aisne department
