= La Hérie =

- Commune
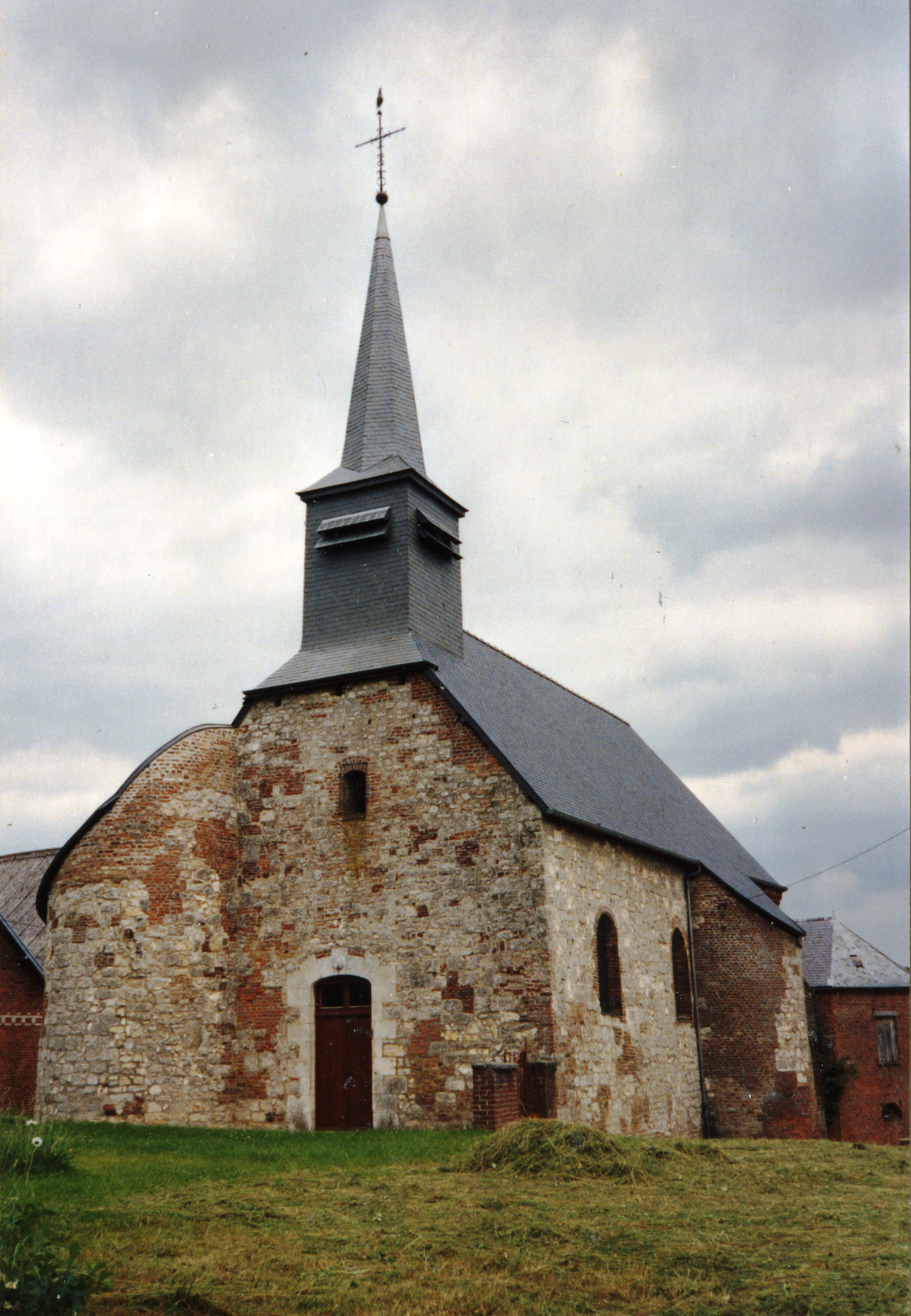
- The church of La Hérie
- Location of La Hérie
- Location within France Location within Hauts-de-France
- Coordinates: 49°53′04″N 4°02′55″E
- Country: France
- Region: Hauts-de-France
- Department: Aisne
- Arrondissement: Vervins
- Canton: Hirson
- Intercommunality: CC Trois Rivières

Government
  - Mayor (2026–32): Patrick Lagache
- Area^{1}: 4.22 km^{2} (1.63 sq mi)
- Elevation: 195 m (640 ft)
- Highest elevation: 222 m (728 ft)
- Lowest elevation: 146 m (479 ft)
- Population (2023): 125
  - Density: 29.6/km^{2} (76.7/sq mi)
- Time zone: UTC+01:00 (CET)
  - Summer (DST): UTC+02:00 (CEST)
- INSEE/Postal code: 02378 /02500
- ^{1} French Land Register data, which excludes lakes, ponds, glaciers > 1 km^{2} (0.386 sq mi or 247 acres) and river estuaries.

La Hérie (French pronunciation: [la eʁi]) is a commune in the Aisne department in Hauts-de-France in northern France.

== Population ==
Historical population
Year	Pop.	±% p.a.
1968	176	—
1975	179	+0.24%
1982	192	+1.01%
1990	168	−1.66%
1999	164	−0.27%
2007	164	+0.00%
2012	152	−1.51%
2017	143	−1.21%
2023	125	−2.22%
Source: INSEE

== See also ==
- Communes of the Aisne department
