= Effry =

- Commune
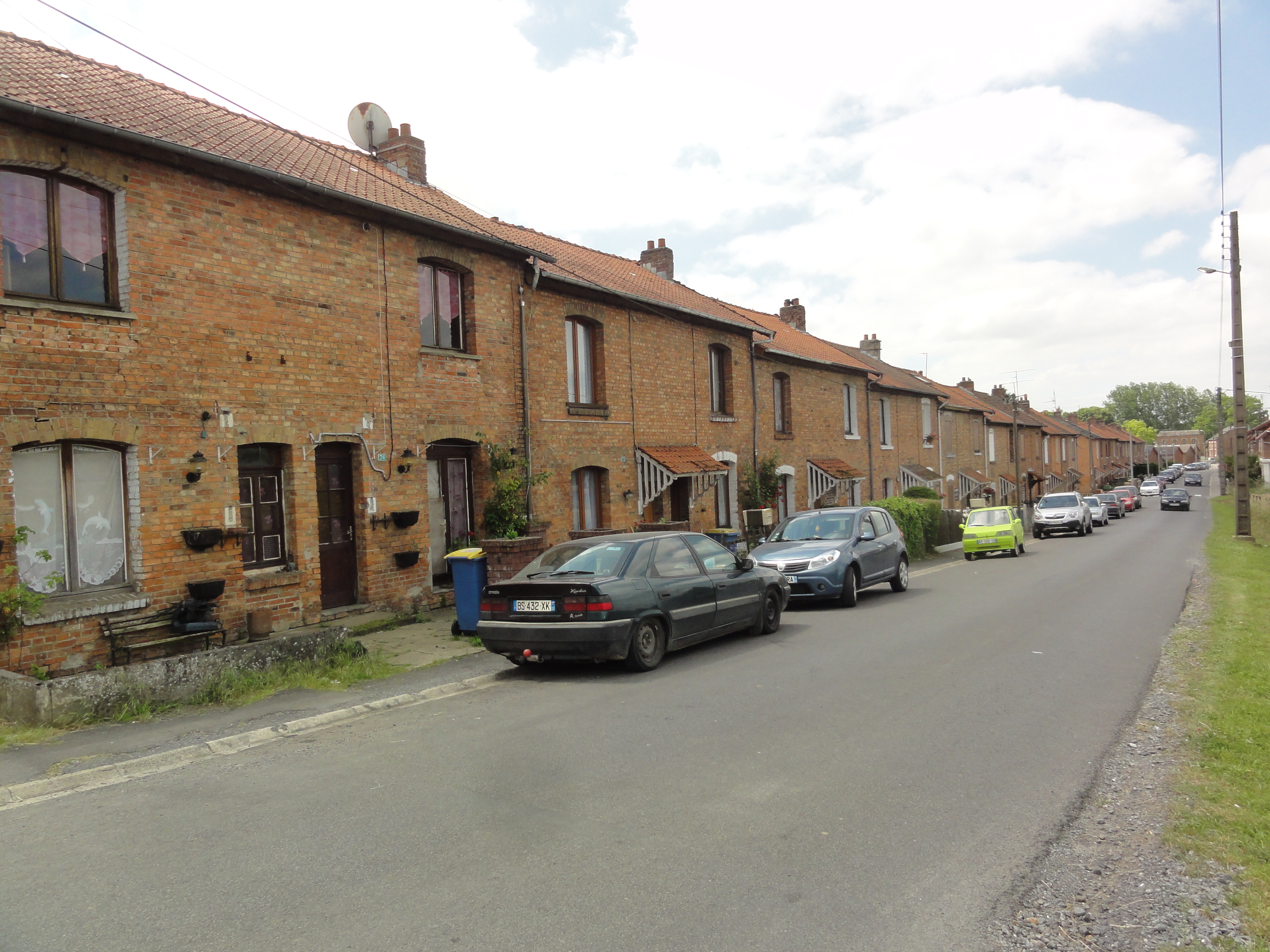
- A road in Effry
- Location of Effry
- Location within France Location within Hauts-de-France
- Coordinates: 49°55′31″N 3°59′07″E
- Country: France
- Region: Hauts-de-France
- Department: Aisne
- Arrondissement: Vervins
- Canton: Hirson
- Intercommunality: CC Trois Rivières

Government
  - Mayor (2026–32): Alain Michel
- Area^{1}: 2.77 km^{2} (1.07 sq mi)
- Elevation: 200 m (660 ft)
- Highest elevation: 223 m (732 ft)
- Lowest elevation: 134 m (440 ft)
- Population (2023): 307
  - Density: 111/km^{2} (287/sq mi)
- Time zone: UTC+01:00 (CET)
  - Summer (DST): UTC+02:00 (CEST)
- INSEE/Postal code: 02275 /02500
- ^{1} French Land Register data, which excludes lakes, ponds, glaciers > 1 km^{2} (0.386 sq mi or 247 acres) and river estuaries.

Effry (French pronunciation: [efʁi]) is a commune in the Aisne department in Hauts-de-France in northern France.

== Population ==
Historical population
Year	Pop.	±% p.a.
1968	606	—
1975	526	−2.00%
1982	392	−4.11%
1990	402	+0.32%
1999	403	+0.03%
2007	354	−1.61%
2012	343	−0.63%
2017	324	−1.13%
2023	307	−0.89%
Source: INSEE

== See also ==
- Communes of the Aisne department
