= Watigny =

- Commune
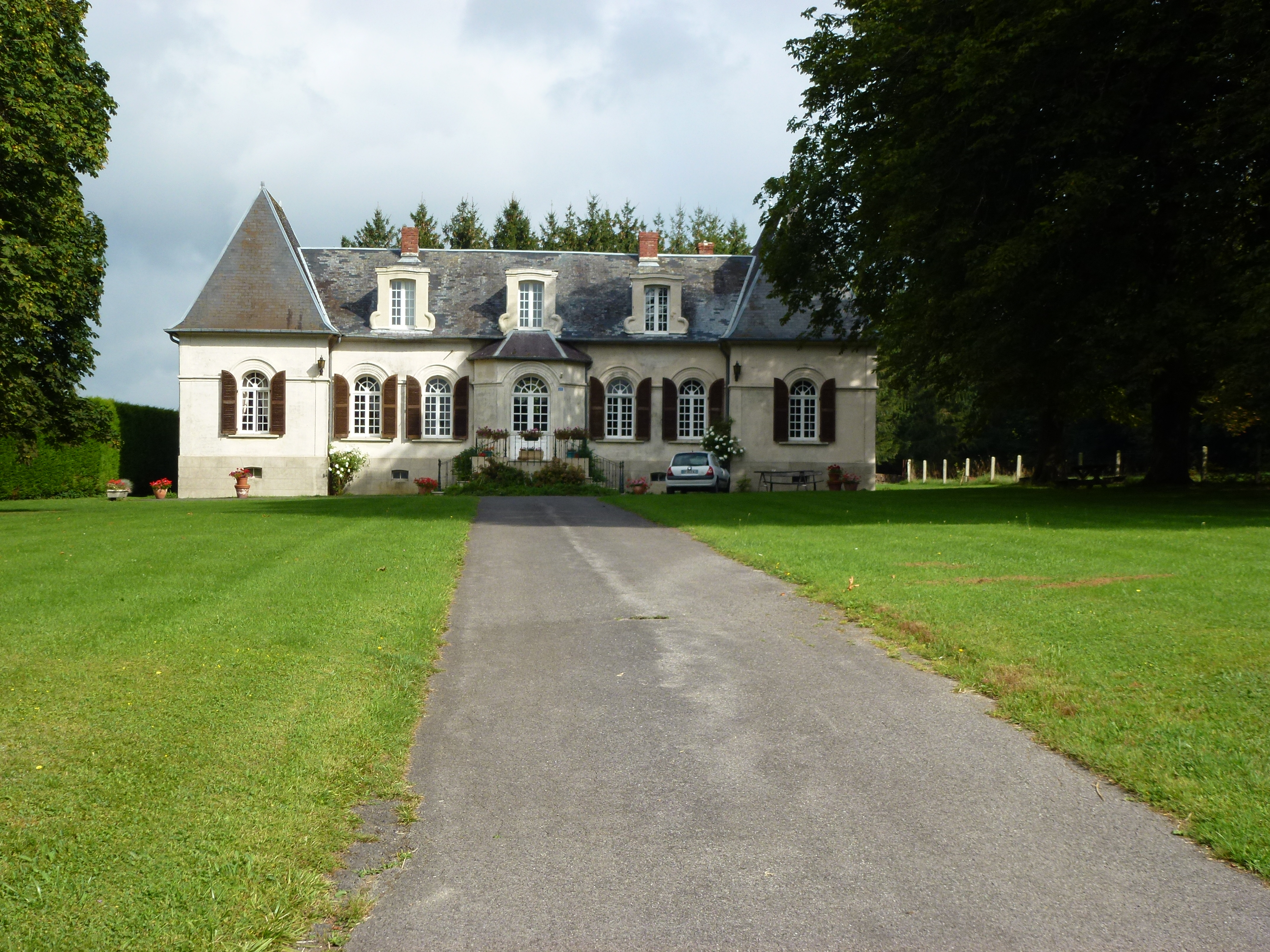
- The chateau of La Cloperie in Watigny
- Location of Watigny
- Location within France Location within Hauts-de-France
- Coordinates: 49°54′09″N 4°11′57″E
- Country: France
- Region: Hauts-de-France
- Department: Aisne
- Arrondissement: Vervins
- Canton: Hirson
- Intercommunality: Trois Rivières

Government
  - Mayor (2026–32): Grégory Dujardin
- Area^{1}: 21.12 km^{2} (8.15 sq mi)
- Elevation: 285 m (935 ft)
- Highest elevation: 295 m (968 ft)
- Lowest elevation: 197 m (646 ft)
- Population (2023): 350
  - Density: 17/km^{2} (43/sq mi)
- Time zone: UTC+01:00 (CET)
  - Summer (DST): UTC+02:00 (CEST)
- INSEE/Postal code: 02831 /02830
- ^{1} French Land Register data, which excludes lakes, ponds, glaciers > 1 km^{2} (0.386 sq mi or 247 acres) and river estuaries.

Watigny (French pronunciation: [watiɲi]) is a commune in the Aisne department in Hauts-de-France in northern France.

== Population ==
Historical population
Year	Pop.	±% p.a.
1968	449	—
1975	361	−3.07%
1982	403	+1.58%
1990	418	+0.46%
1999	369	−1.38%
2007	364	−0.17%
2012	374	+0.54%
2017	379	+0.27%
2023	350	−1.32%
Source: INSEE

== See also ==
- Communes of the Aisne department
