= Éparcy =

- Commune
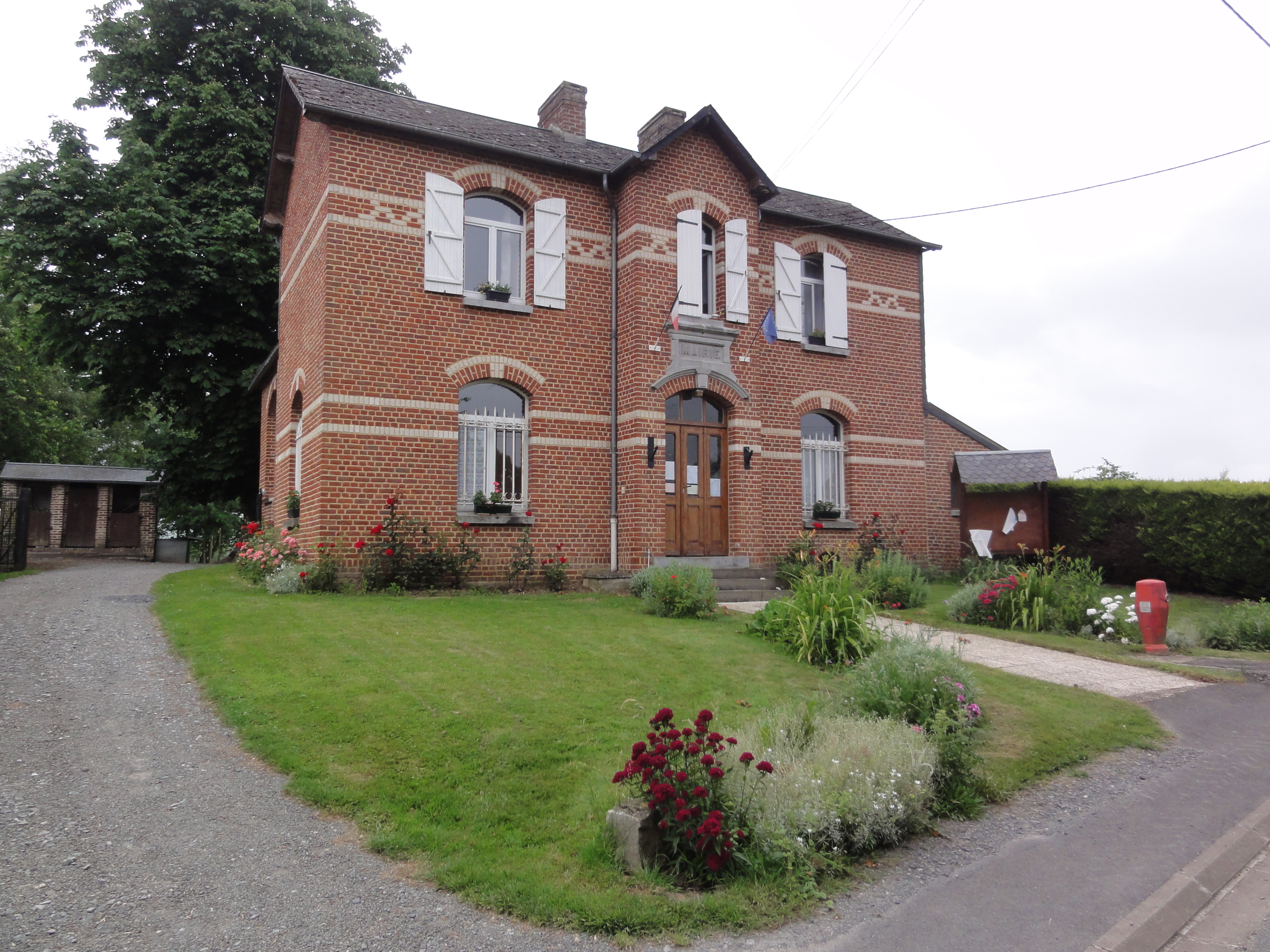
- The town hall of Éparcy
- Location of Éparcy
- Location within France Location within Hauts-de-France
- Coordinates: 49°52′27″N 4°03′40″E
- Country: France
- Region: Hauts-de-France
- Department: Aisne
- Arrondissement: Vervins
- Canton: Hirson
- Intercommunality: CC Trois Rivières

Government
  - Mayor (2026–32): Pascal Bailly
- Area^{1}: 7.52 km^{2} (2.90 sq mi)
- Elevation: 151 m (495 ft)
- Highest elevation: 207 m (679 ft)
- Lowest elevation: 147 m (482 ft)
- Population (2023): 38
  - Density: 5.1/km^{2} (13/sq mi)
- Time zone: UTC+01:00 (CET)
  - Summer (DST): UTC+02:00 (CEST)
- INSEE/Postal code: 02278 /02500
- ^{1} French Land Register data, which excludes lakes, ponds, glaciers > 1 km^{2} (0.386 sq mi or 247 acres) and river estuaries.

Éparcy (French pronunciation: [epaʁsi]) is a commune in the Aisne department in Hauts-de-France in northern France.

== Population ==
Historical population
Year	Pop.	±% p.a.
1968	62	—
1975	61	−0.23%
1982	47	−3.66%
1990	42	−1.40%
1999	49	+1.73%
2007	45	−1.06%
2012	43	−0.91%
2017	30	−6.95%
2023	38	+4.02%
Source: INSEE

== See also ==
- Communes of the Aisne department
