= Wimy =

- Commune
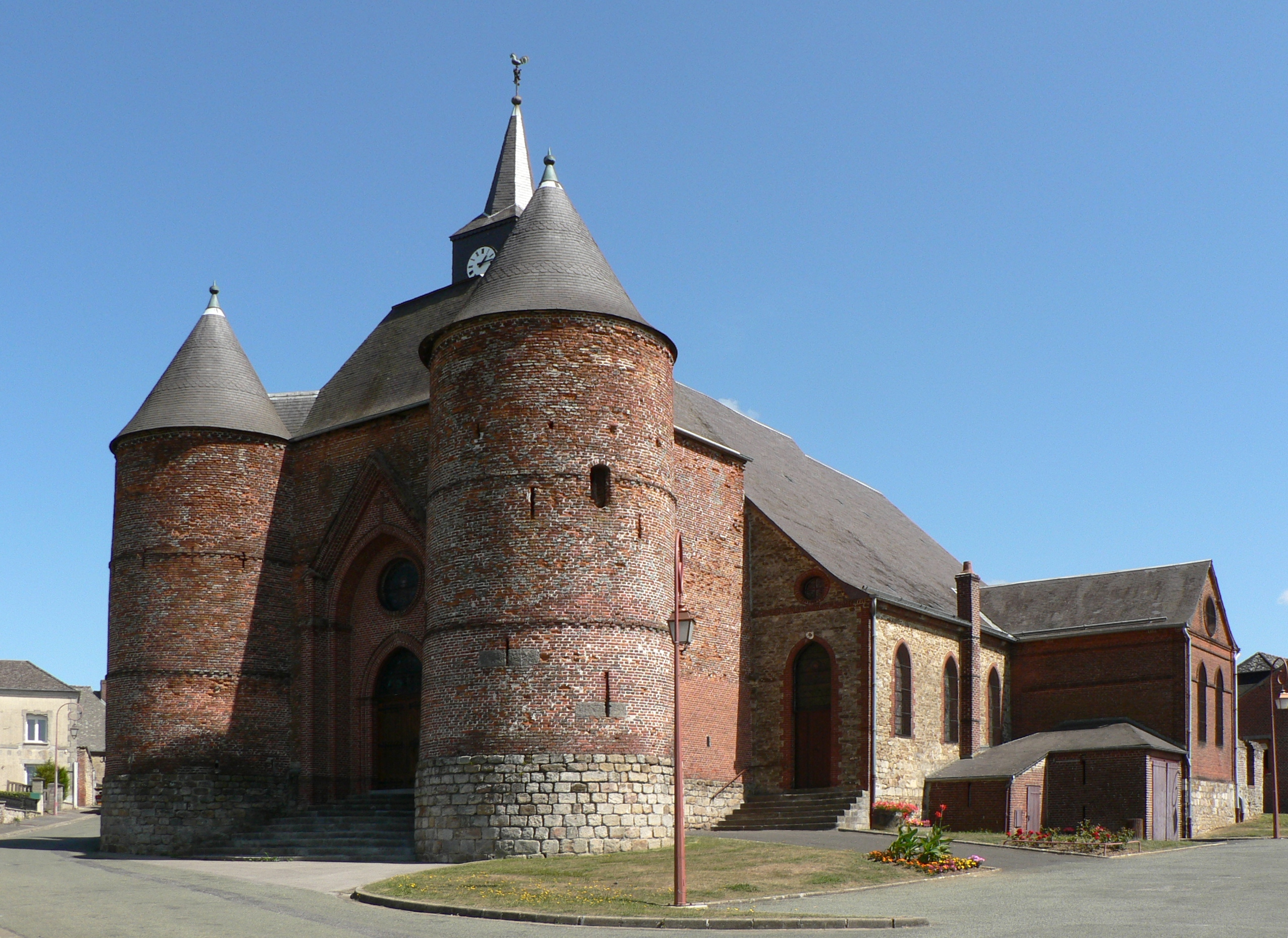
- The fortress church of Wimy
- Location of Wimy
- Location within France Location within Hauts-de-France
- Coordinates: 49°56′05″N 3°59′54″E
- Country: France
- Region: Hauts-de-France
- Department: Aisne
- Arrondissement: Vervins
- Canton: Hirson
- Intercommunality: Trois Rivières

Government
  - Mayor (2026–32): Mélanie Nicolas
- Area^{1}: 12.04 km^{2} (4.65 sq mi)
- Elevation: 177 m (581 ft)
- Highest elevation: 238 m (781 ft)
- Lowest elevation: 136 m (446 ft)
- Population (2023): 460
  - Density: 38/km^{2} (99/sq mi)
- Time zone: UTC+01:00 (CET)
  - Summer (DST): UTC+02:00 (CEST)
- INSEE/Postal code: 02833 /02500
- ^{1} French Land Register data, which excludes lakes, ponds, glaciers > 1 km^{2} (0.386 sq mi or 247 acres) and river estuaries.

Wimy (French pronunciation: [wimi]) is a commune in the Aisne department in Hauts-de-France in northern France.

== Population ==
Historical population
| Year | Pop. | ±% p.a. |
|---|---|---|
| 1968 | 556 | — |
| 1975 | 464 | −2.55% |
| 1982 | 502 | +1.13% |
| 1990 | 485 | −0.43% |
| 1999 | 477 | −0.18% |
| 2007 | 499 | +0.57% |
| 2012 | 448 | −2.13% |
| 2017 | 487 | +1.68% |
| 2023 | 460 | −0.95% |
Source: INSEE

== See also ==
- Communes of the Aisne department
