= Neuve-Maison =

- Commune
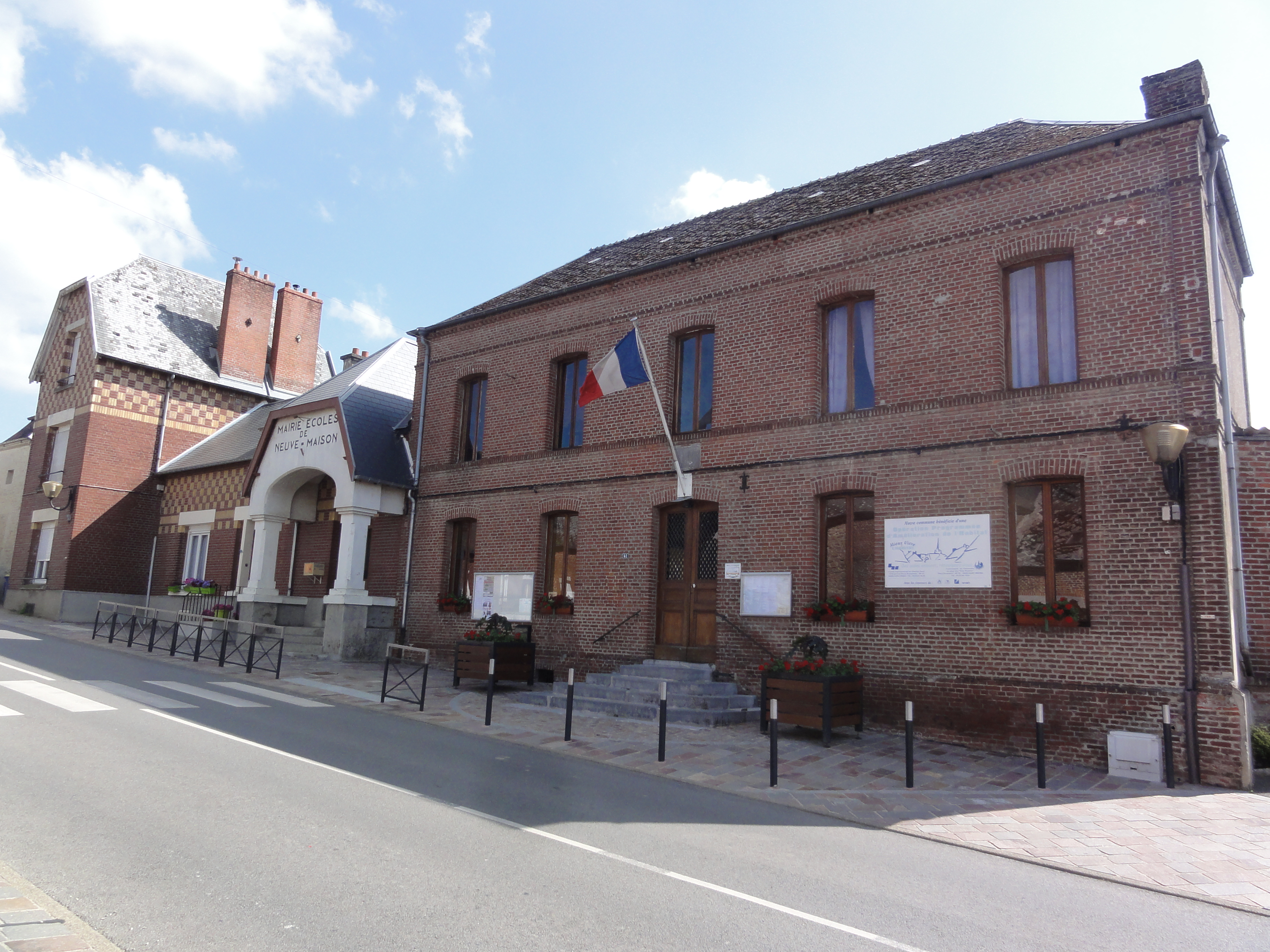
- The town hall and school of Neuve-Maison
- Location of Neuve-Maison
- Location within France Location within Hauts-de-France
- Coordinates: 49°55′52″N 4°02′39″E
- Country: France
- Region: Hauts-de-France
- Department: Aisne
- Arrondissement: Vervins
- Canton: Hirson
- Intercommunality: CC Trois Rivières

Government
  - Mayor (2026–32): Thomas Murgia
- Area^{1}: 8.42 km^{2} (3.25 sq mi)
- Elevation: 167 m (548 ft)
- Highest elevation: 200 m (660 ft)
- Lowest elevation: 143 m (469 ft)
- Population (2023): 602
  - Density: 71.5/km^{2} (185/sq mi)
- Time zone: UTC+01:00 (CET)
  - Summer (DST): UTC+02:00 (CEST)
- INSEE/Postal code: 02544 /02500
- ^{1} French Land Register data, which excludes lakes, ponds, glaciers > 1 km^{2} (0.386 sq mi or 247 acres) and river estuaries.

Neuve-Maison (French pronunciation: [nœv mɛzɔ̃]) is a commune in the Aisne department in Hauts-de-France in northern France.

== Population ==
Historical population
Year	Pop.	±% p.a.
1968	487	—
1975	482	−0.15%
1982	512	+0.87%
1990	669	+3.40%
1999	617	−0.90%
2007	629	+0.24%
2012	597	−1.04%
2017	611	+0.46%
2023	602	−0.25%
Source: INSEE

== See also ==
- Communes of the Aisne department
