= Origny-en-Thiérache =

- Commune
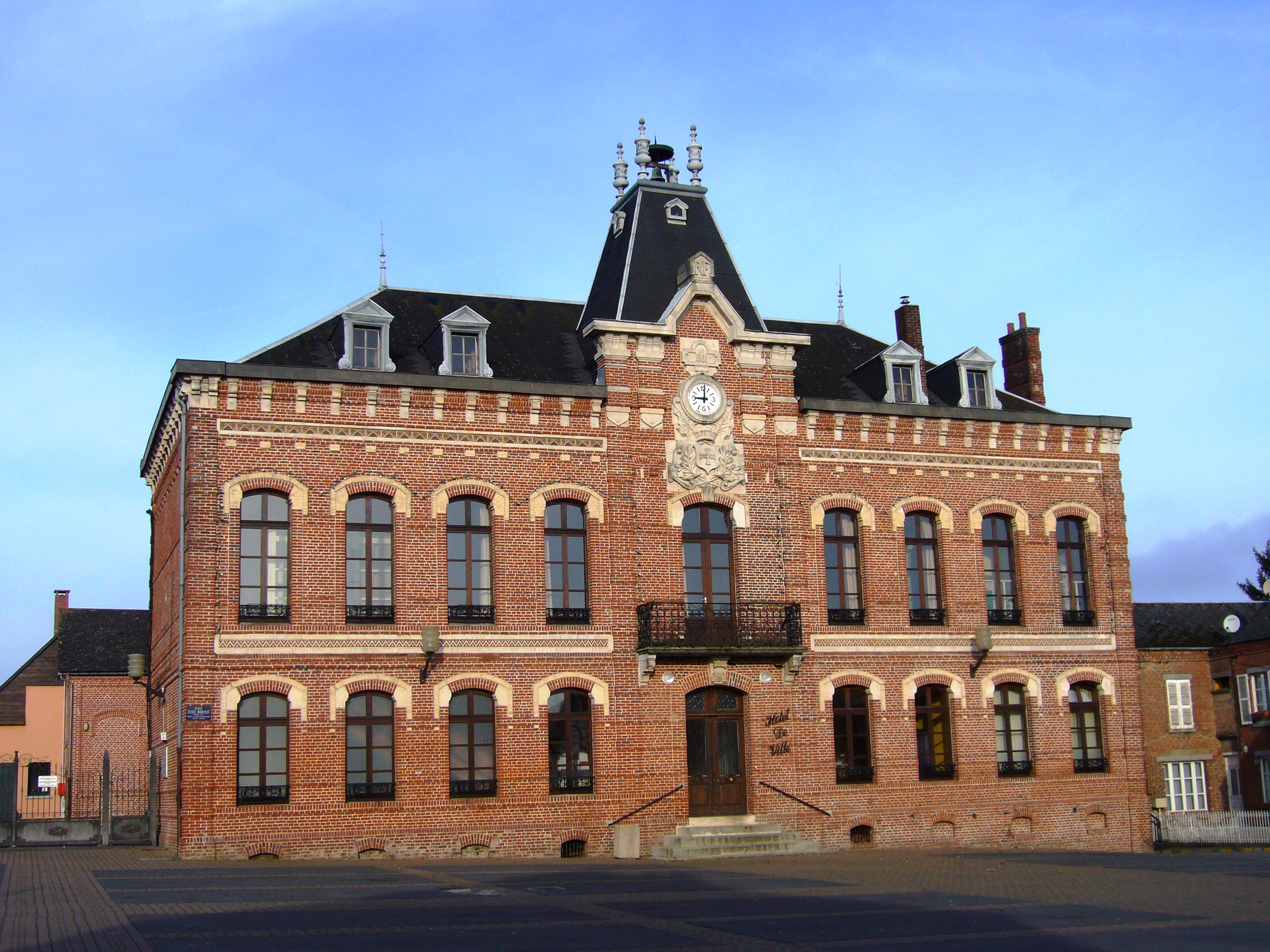
- Town hall

- Coat of arms
- Location of Origny-en-Thiérache
- Location within France Location within Hauts-de-France
- Coordinates: 49°53′42″N 4°01′06″E
- Country: France
- Region: Hauts-de-France
- Department: Aisne
- Arrondissement: Vervins
- Canton: Hirson
- Intercommunality: CC Trois Rivières

Government
  - Mayor (2026–32): Jean-Louis Perotin
- Area^{1}: 16.48 km^{2} (6.36 sq mi)
- Elevation: 143 m (469 ft)
- Highest elevation: 227 m (745 ft)
- Lowest elevation: 132 m (433 ft)
- Population (2023): 1,354
  - Density: 82.16/km^{2} (212.8/sq mi)
- Time zone: UTC+01:00 (CET)
  - Summer (DST): UTC+02:00 (CEST)
- INSEE/Postal code: 02574 /02550
- ^{1} French Land Register data, which excludes lakes, ponds, glaciers > 1 km^{2} (0.386 sq mi or 247 acres) and river estuaries.

Origny-en-Thiérache (French pronunciation: [ɔʁiɲi ɑ̃ tjeʁaʃ], literally Origny in Thiérache) is a commune in the Aisne department in Hauts-de-France in northern France.

== Population ==
Historical population
Year	Pop.	±% p.a.
1968	1,861	—
1975	1,717	−1.14%
1982	1,695	−0.18%
1990	1,557	−1.06%
1999	1,444	−0.83%
2007	1,517	+0.62%
2012	1,577	+0.78%
2017	1,453	−1.62%
2023	1,354	−1.17%
Source: INSEE

== Personalities ==
- Pigneau de Behaine

== See also ==
- Communes of the Aisne department
