= Bucilly =

- Commune
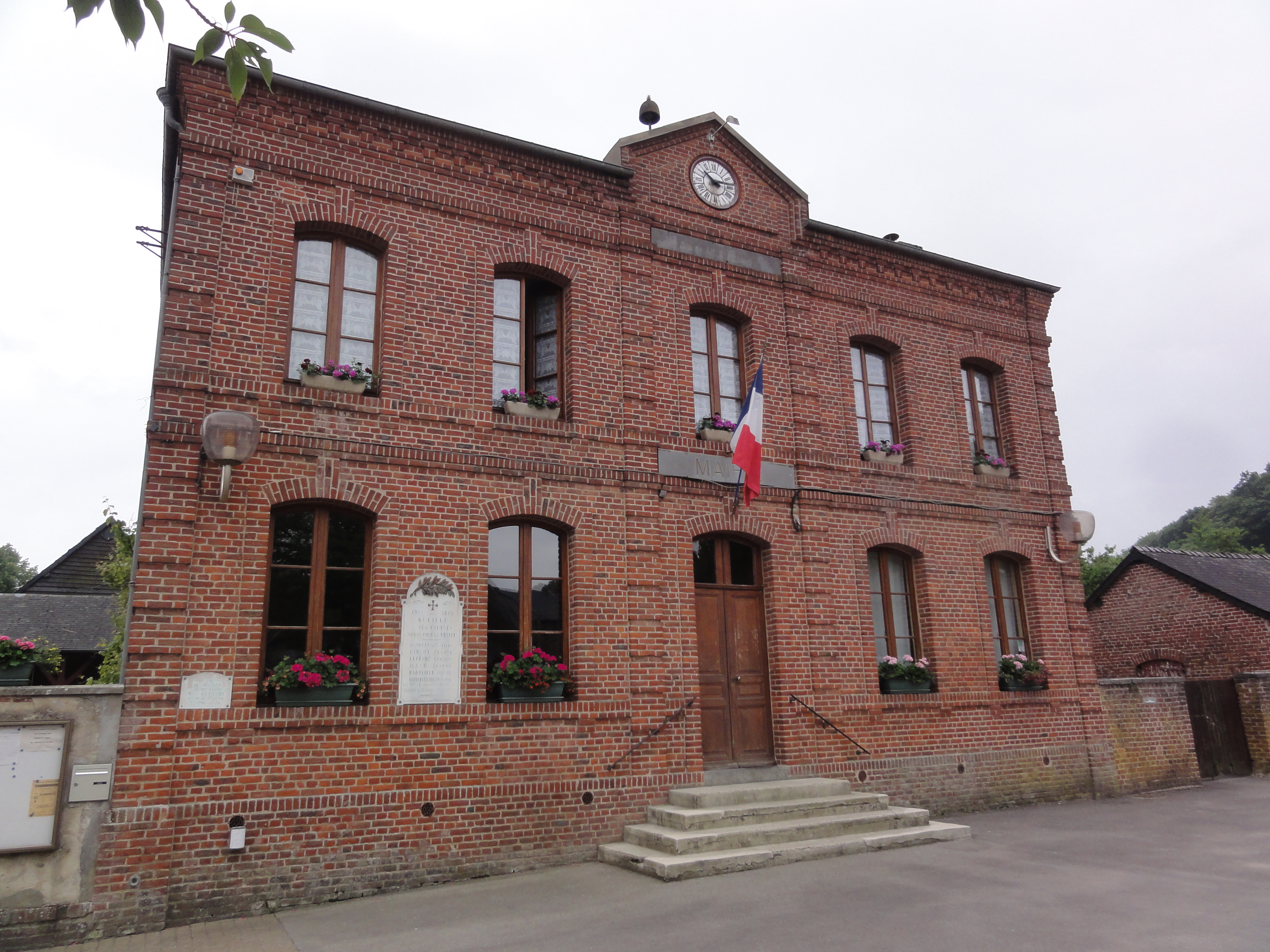
- The town hall of Bucilly
- Location of Bucilly
- Location within France Location within Hauts-de-France
- Coordinates: 49°52′40″N 4°05′37″E
- Country: France
- Region: Hauts-de-France
- Department: Aisne
- Arrondissement: Vervins
- Canton: Hirson
- Intercommunality: CC Trois Rivières

Government
  - Mayor (2026–32): Christian Legrand
- Area^{1}: 12.85 km^{2} (4.96 sq mi)
- Elevation: 159 m (522 ft)
- Highest elevation: 236 m (774 ft)
- Lowest elevation: 152 m (499 ft)
- Population (2023): 204
  - Density: 15.9/km^{2} (41.1/sq mi)
- Time zone: UTC+01:00 (CET)
  - Summer (DST): UTC+02:00 (CEST)
- INSEE/Postal code: 02130 /02500
- ^{1} French Land Register data, which excludes lakes, ponds, glaciers > 1 km^{2} (0.386 sq mi or 247 acres) and river estuaries.

Bucilly is a commune in the department of Aisne in Hauts-de-France in northern France.

== Population ==
Historical population
Year	Pop.	±% p.a.
1968	250	—
1975	245	−0.29%
1982	216	−1.78%
1990	246	+1.64%
1999	229	−0.79%
2007	204	−1.43%
2012	188	−1.62%
2017	193	+0.53%
2023	204	+0.93%
Source: INSEE

== See also ==
- Communes of the Aisne department
