= Ohis =

- Commune
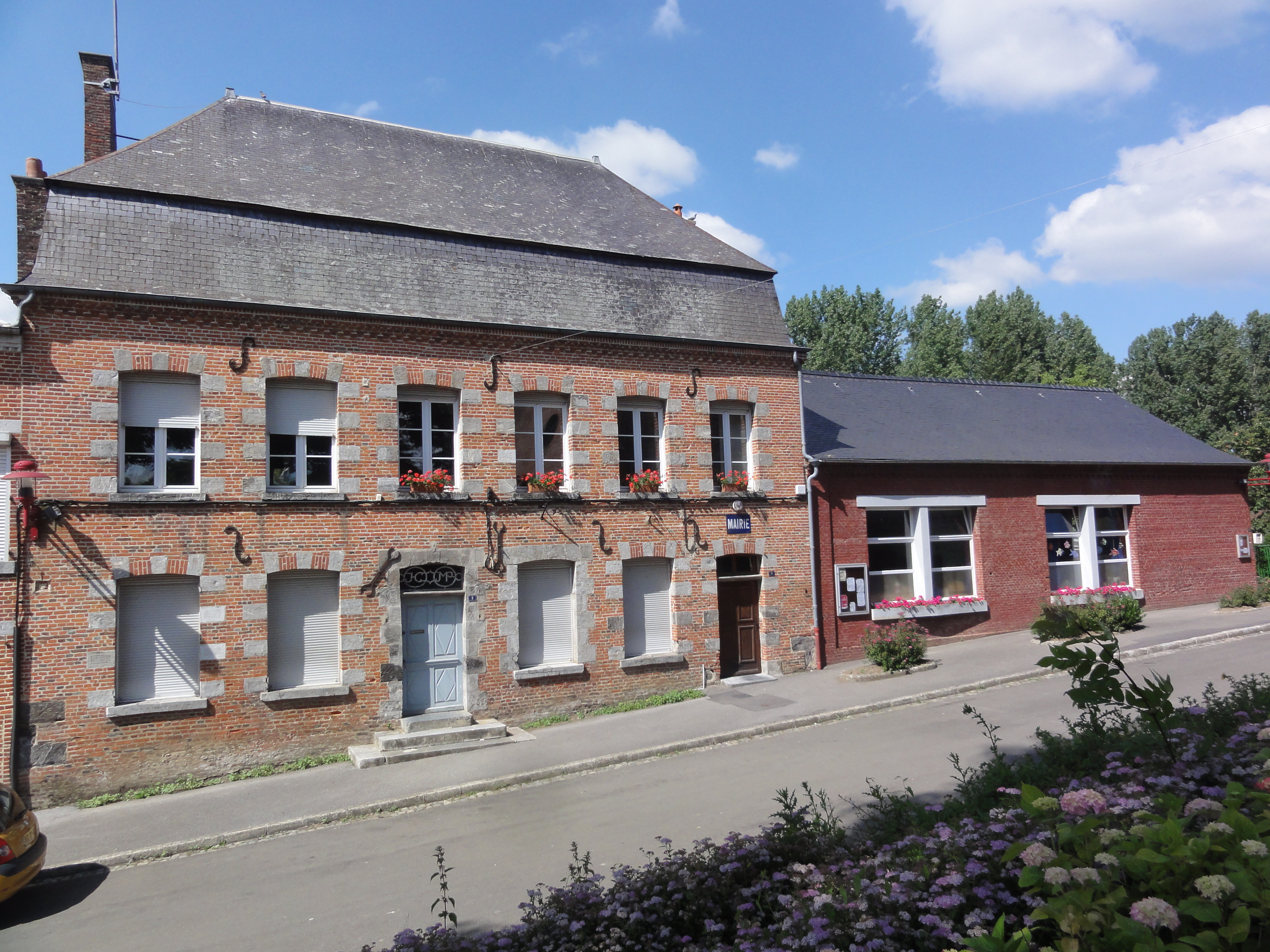
- The town hall of Ohis
- Location of Ohis
- Location within France Location within Hauts-de-France
- Coordinates: 49°55′50″N 4°00′37″E
- Country: France
- Region: Hauts-de-France
- Department: Aisne
- Arrondissement: Vervins
- Canton: Hirson
- Intercommunality: CC Trois Rivières

Government
  - Mayor (2026–32): Aline Dervillée
- Area^{1}: 6.48 km^{2} (2.50 sq mi)
- Elevation: 220 m (720 ft)
- Highest elevation: 228 m (748 ft)
- Lowest elevation: 138 m (453 ft)
- Population (2023): 269
  - Density: 41.5/km^{2} (108/sq mi)
- Time zone: UTC+01:00 (CET)
  - Summer (DST): UTC+02:00 (CEST)
- INSEE/Postal code: 02567 /02500
- ^{1} French Land Register data, which excludes lakes, ponds, glaciers > 1 km^{2} (0.386 sq mi or 247 acres) and river estuaries.

Ohis is a commune in the Aisne department in Hauts-de-France in northern France.

== Population ==
Historical population
Year	Pop.	±% p.a.
1968	386	—
1975	345	−1.59%
1982	341	−0.17%
1990	332	−0.33%
1999	319	−0.44%
2007	310	−0.36%
2012	310	+0.00%
2017	303	−0.46%
2023	269	−1.96%
Source: INSEE

== See also ==
- Communes of the Aisne department
