= Besmont =

- Commune
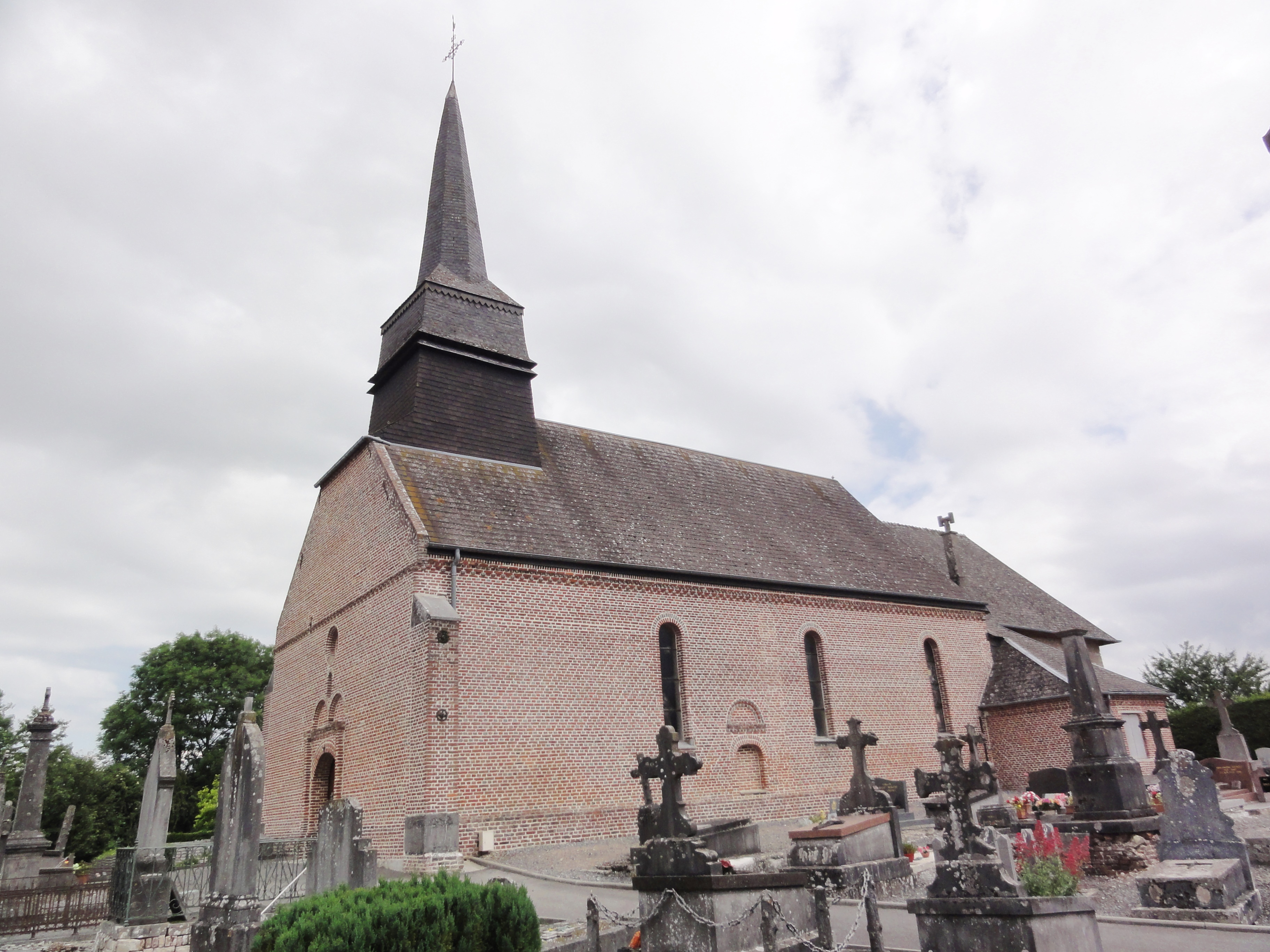
- Location of Besmont
- Location within France Location within Hauts-de-France
- Coordinates: 49°50′18″N 4°07′21″E
- Country: France
- Region: Hauts-de-France
- Department: Aisne
- Arrondissement: Vervins
- Canton: Hirson
- Intercommunality: CC Trois Rivières

Government
  - Mayor (2026–32): Michel Dru
- Area^{1}: 15.86 km^{2} (6.12 sq mi)
- Elevation: 202 m (663 ft)
- Highest elevation: 245 m (804 ft)
- Lowest elevation: 165 m (541 ft)
- Population (2023): 132
  - Density: 8.32/km^{2} (21.6/sq mi)
- Time zone: UTC+01:00 (CET)
  - Summer (DST): UTC+02:00 (CEST)
- INSEE/Postal code: 02079 /02500
- ^{1} French Land Register data, which excludes lakes, ponds, glaciers > 1 km^{2} (0.386 sq mi or 247 acres) and river estuaries.

Besmont is a commune in the department of Aisne in Hauts-de-France in northern France.

== Population ==
Historical population
Year	Pop.	±% p.a.
1968	216	—
1975	180	−2.57%
1982	158	−1.85%
1990	165	+0.54%
1999	146	−1.35%
2007	148	+0.17%
2012	158	+1.32%
2017	152	−0.77%
2023	132	−2.32%
Source: INSEE

== See also ==
- Communes of the Aisne department
