= Saint-Michel, Aisne =

Saint-Michel
- Commune
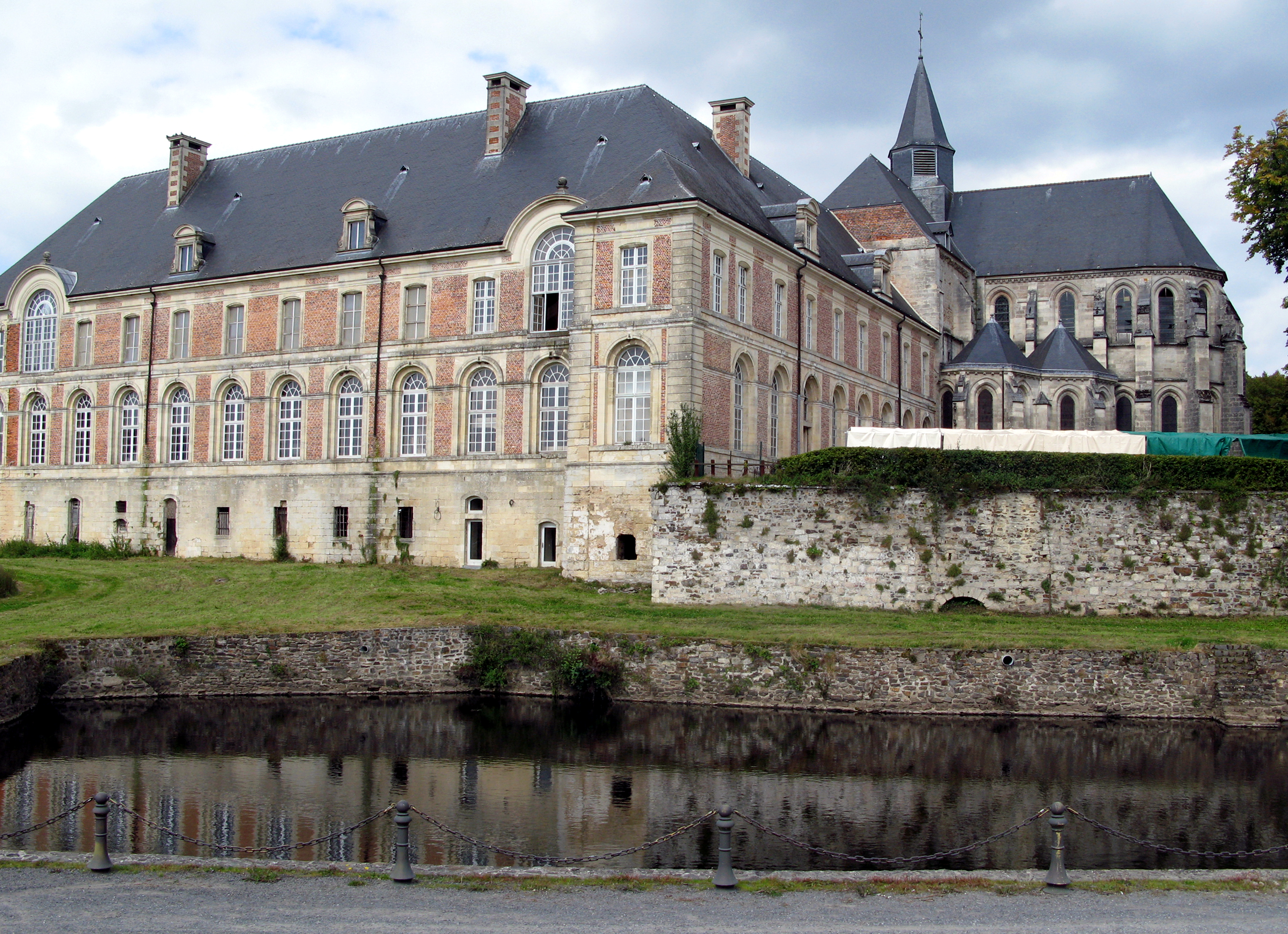
- Saint-Michel Abbey

- Coat of arms
- Location of Saint-Michel
- Location within France Location within Hauts-de-France
- Coordinates: 49°55′07″N 4°08′01″E
- Country: France
- Region: Hauts-de-France
- Department: Aisne
- Arrondissement: Vervins
- Canton: Hirson
- Intercommunality: CC Trois Rivières

Government
  - Mayor (2026–32): Thierry Crohin
- Area^{1}: 42.2 km^{2} (16.3 sq mi)
- Elevation: 201 m (659 ft)
- Highest elevation: 278 m (912 ft)
- Lowest elevation: 172 m (564 ft)
- Population (2023): 3,199
  - Density: 75.8/km^{2} (196/sq mi)
- Time zone: UTC+01:00 (CET)
  - Summer (DST): UTC+02:00 (CEST)
- INSEE/Postal code: 02684 /02830
- ^{1} French Land Register data, which excludes lakes, ponds, glaciers > 1 km^{2} (0.386 sq mi or 247 acres) and river estuaries.

Saint-Michel (French pronunciation: [sɛ̃ miʃɛl]) is a commune in the Aisne department in Hauts-de-France in northern France. It is also unofficially called Saint-Michel-en-Thiérache.

== Population ==
Historical population
Year	Pop.	±% p.a.
1968	4,342	—
1975	4,155	−0.63%
1982	4,044	−0.39%
1990	3,783	−0.83%
1999	3,656	−0.38%
2007	3,521	−0.47%
2012	3,542	+0.12%
2017	3,417	−0.72%
2023	3,199	−1.09%
Source: INSEE

== Personalities ==
- French Revolution leader Antoine Joseph Santerre, whose family moved from Saint-Michel to Paris before the Revolution.

== See also ==
- Communes of the Aisne department
