= Logny-lès-Aubenton =

- Commune
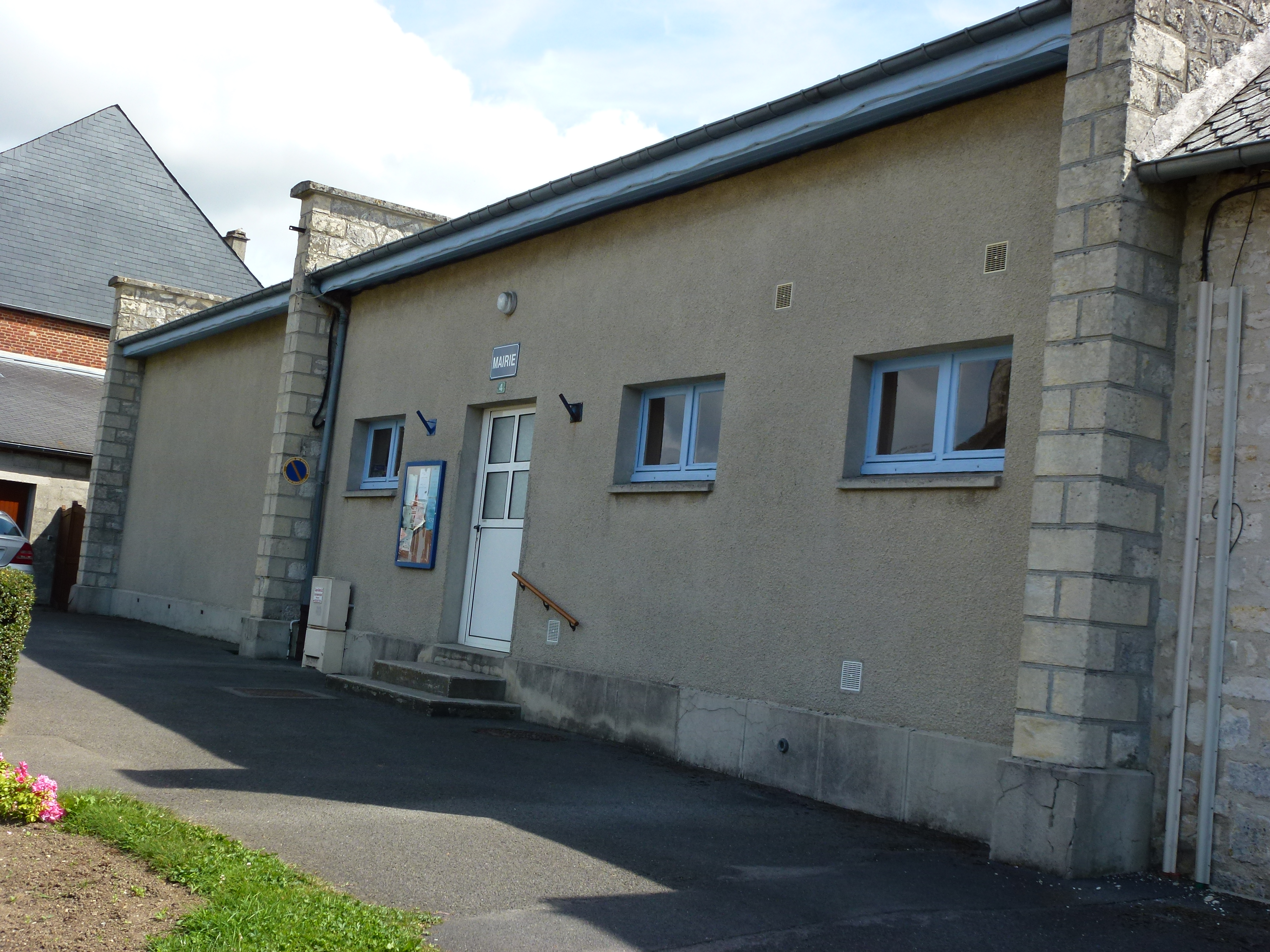
- The town hall of Logny-lès-Aubenton
- Location of Logny-lès-Aubenton
- Location within France Location within Hauts-de-France
- Coordinates: 49°49′45″N 4°12′41″E
- Country: France
- Region: Hauts-de-France
- Department: Aisne
- Arrondissement: Vervins
- Canton: Hirson
- Intercommunality: CC Trois Rivières

Government
  - Mayor (2026–32): Philippe Lefevre
- Area^{1}: 8.15 km^{2} (3.15 sq mi)
- Elevation: 180 m (590 ft)
- Highest elevation: 245 m (804 ft)
- Lowest elevation: 172 m (564 ft)
- Population (2023): 84
  - Density: 10/km^{2} (27/sq mi)
- Time zone: UTC+01:00 (CET)
  - Summer (DST): UTC+02:00 (CEST)
- INSEE/Postal code: 02435 /02500
- ^{1} French Land Register data, which excludes lakes, ponds, glaciers > 1 km^{2} (0.386 sq mi or 247 acres) and river estuaries.

Logny-lès-Aubenton is a commune in the Aisne department in Hauts-de-France in northern France.

== Population ==
Historical population
Year	Pop.	±% p.a.
1968	106	—
1975	90	−2.31%
1982	70	−3.53%
1990	82	+2.00%
1999	73	−1.28%
2007	75	+0.34%
2012	80	+1.30%
2017	74	−1.55%
2023	84	+2.14%
Source: INSEE

== See also ==
- Communes of the Aisne department
