= Mont-Saint-Jean, Aisne =

Mont-Saint-Jean
- Commune
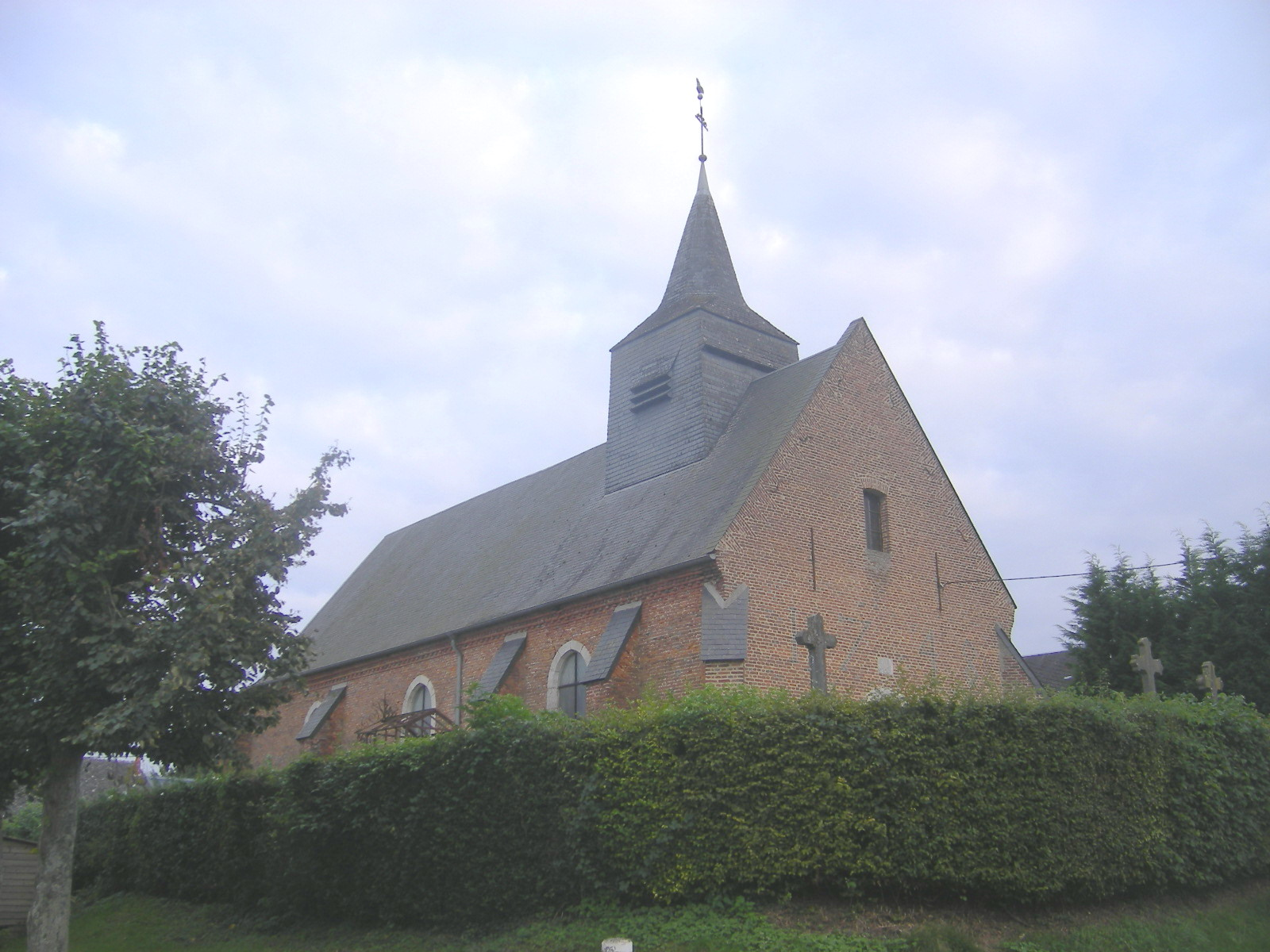
- The church of Mont-Saint-Jean
- Location of Mont-Saint-Jean
- Location within France Location within Hauts-de-France
- Coordinates: 49°47′26″N 4°12′28″E
- Country: France
- Region: Hauts-de-France
- Department: Aisne
- Arrondissement: Vervins
- Canton: Hirson
- Intercommunality: CC Trois Rivières

Government
  - Mayor (2026–32): Patrick Feuillet
- Area^{1}: 3.95 km^{2} (1.53 sq mi)
- Elevation: 243 m (797 ft)
- Highest elevation: 266 m (873 ft)
- Lowest elevation: 192 m (630 ft)
- Population (2023): 79
  - Density: 20/km^{2} (52/sq mi)
- Time zone: UTC+01:00 (CET)
  - Summer (DST): UTC+02:00 (CEST)
- INSEE/Postal code: 02522 /02360
- ^{1} French Land Register data, which excludes lakes, ponds, glaciers > 1 km^{2} (0.386 sq mi or 247 acres) and river estuaries.

Mont-Saint-Jean (French pronunciation: [mɔ̃ sɛ̃ ʒɑ̃]) is a commune in the Aisne department in Hauts-de-France in northern France.

== Population ==
Historical population
Year	Pop.	±% p.a.
1968	96	—
1975	82	−2.23%
1982	77	−0.89%
1990	82	+0.79%
1999	76	−0.84%
2007	69	−1.20%
2012	78	+2.48%
2017	75	−0.78%
2023	79	+0.87%
Source: INSEE

== See also ==
- Communes of the Aisne department
