= Saint-Clément, Aisne =

Saint-Clément
- Commune
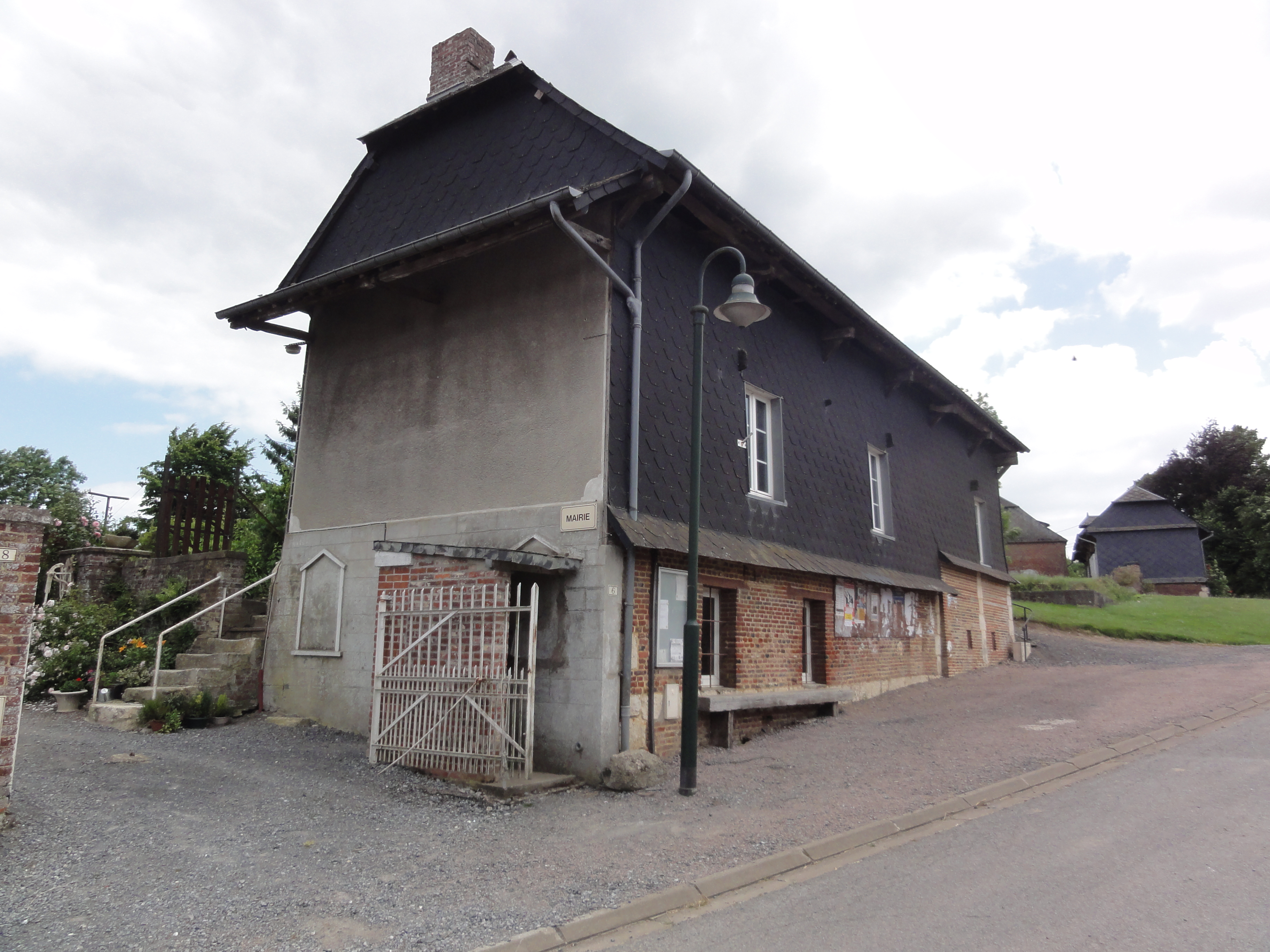
- The town hall of Saint-Clément
- Location of Saint-Clément
- Location within France Location within Hauts-de-France
- Coordinates: 49°46′36″N 4°04′25″E
- Country: France
- Region: Hauts-de-France
- Department: Aisne
- Arrondissement: Vervins
- Canton: Hirson
- Intercommunality: CC Trois Rivières

Government
  - Mayor (2026–32): Jean-Paul Hardy
- Area^{1}: 5.01 km^{2} (1.93 sq mi)
- Elevation: 209 m (686 ft)
- Highest elevation: 212 m (696 ft)
- Lowest elevation: 141 m (463 ft)
- Population (2023): 44
  - Density: 8.8/km^{2} (23/sq mi)
- Time zone: UTC+01:00 (CET)
  - Summer (DST): UTC+02:00 (CEST)
- INSEE/Postal code: 02674 /02360
- ^{1} French Land Register data, which excludes lakes, ponds, glaciers > 1 km^{2} (0.386 sq mi or 247 acres) and river estuaries.

Saint-Clément (French pronunciation: [sɛ̃ klemɑ̃]) is a commune in the Aisne department in Hauts-de-France in northern France.

== Population ==
Historical population
Year	Pop.	±% p.a.
1968	80	—
1975	66	−2.71%
1982	71	+1.05%
1990	69	−0.36%
1999	59	−1.72%
2007	53	−1.33%
2012	53	+0.00%
2017	50	−1.16%
2023	44	−2.11%
Source: INSEE

== See also ==
- Communes of the Aisne department
