= Martigny, Aisne =

Martigny
- Commune
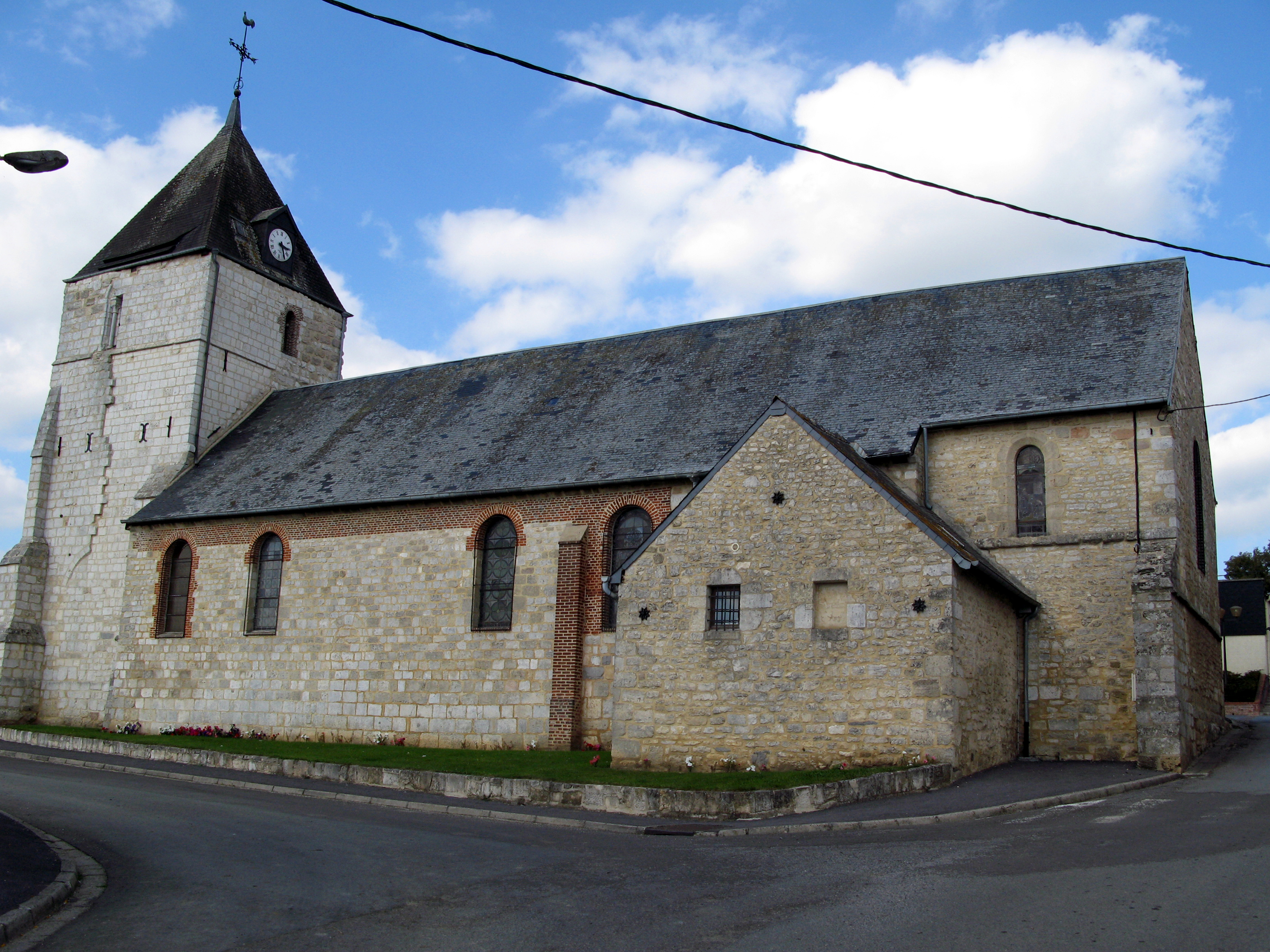
- The church of Martigny
- Location of Martigny
- Location within France Location within Hauts-de-France
- Coordinates: 49°51′35″N 4°08′15″E
- Country: France
- Region: Hauts-de-France
- Department: Aisne
- Arrondissement: Vervins
- Canton: Hirson
- Intercommunality: CC Trois Rivières

Government
  - Mayor (2026–32): Jérôme Duverdier
- Area^{1}: 16.96 km^{2} (6.55 sq mi)
- Elevation: 195 m (640 ft)
- Highest elevation: 228 m (748 ft)
- Lowest elevation: 157 m (515 ft)
- Population (2023): 410
  - Density: 24/km^{2} (63/sq mi)
- Time zone: UTC+01:00 (CET)
  - Summer (DST): UTC+02:00 (CEST)
- INSEE/Postal code: 02470 /02500
- ^{1} French Land Register data, which excludes lakes, ponds, glaciers > 1 km^{2} (0.386 sq mi or 247 acres) and river estuaries.

Martigny (French pronunciation: [maʁtiɲi]) is a commune in the Aisne department in Hauts-de-France in northern France.

== Population ==
Historical population
Year	Pop.	±% p.a.
1968	561	—
1975	525	−0.94%
1982	450	−2.18%
1990	457	+0.19%
1999	460	+0.07%
2007	451	−0.25%
2012	441	−0.45%
2017	434	−0.32%
2023	410	−0.94%
Source: INSEE

== See also ==
- Communes of the Aisne department
