= Coingt =

- Commune
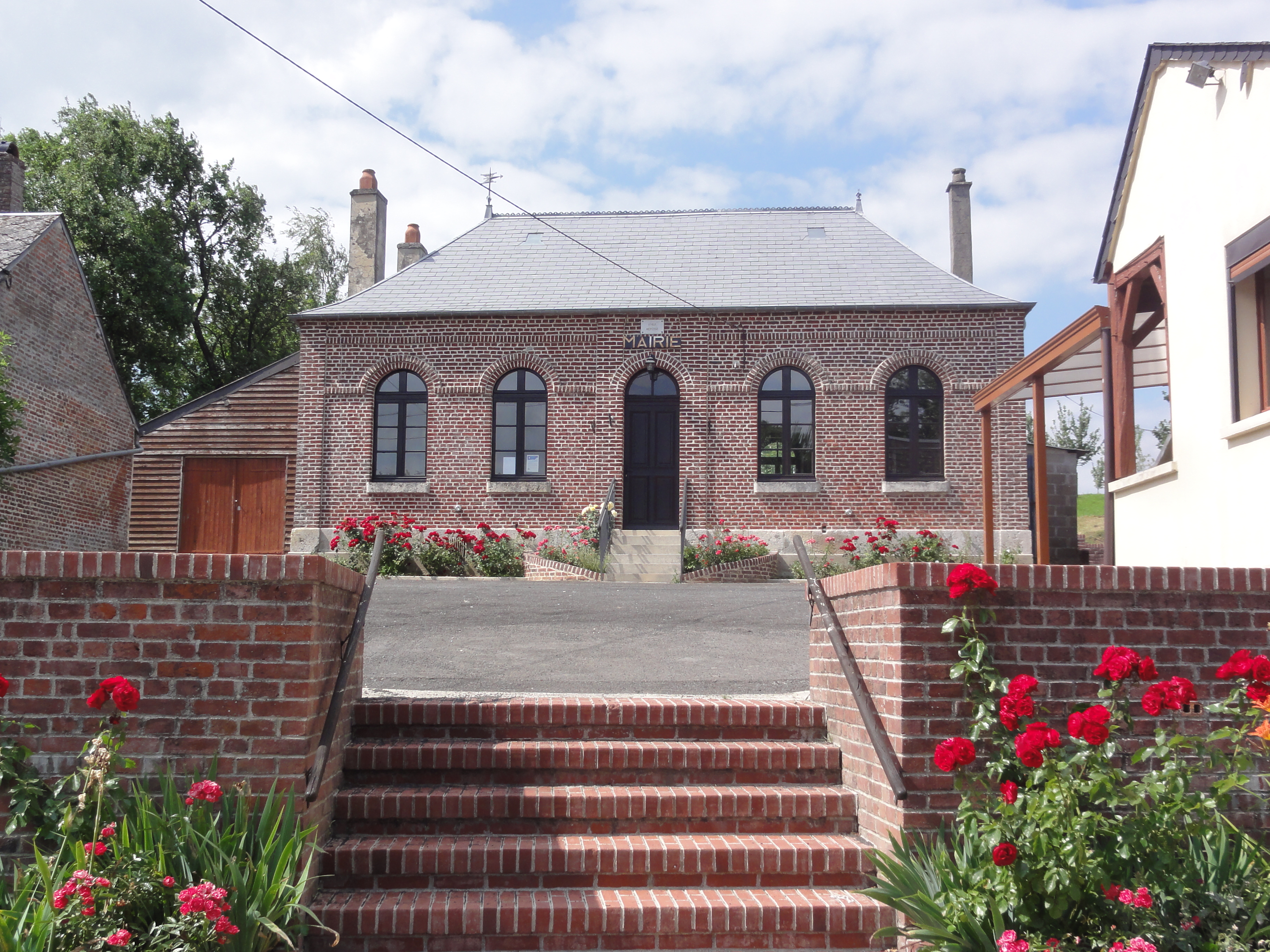
- The town hall of Coingt
- Location of Coingt
- Location within France Location within Hauts-de-France
- Coordinates: 49°47′37″N 4°05′32″E
- Country: France
- Region: Hauts-de-France
- Department: Aisne
- Arrondissement: Vervins
- Canton: Hirson
- Intercommunality: CC Trois Rivières

Government
  - Mayor (2026–32): Pascal Huyghe
- Area^{1}: 7.31 km^{2} (2.82 sq mi)
- Elevation: 225 m (738 ft)
- Highest elevation: 231 m (758 ft)
- Lowest elevation: 155 m (509 ft)
- Population (2023): 61
  - Density: 8.3/km^{2} (22/sq mi)
- Time zone: UTC+01:00 (CET)
  - Summer (DST): UTC+02:00 (CEST)
- INSEE/Postal code: 02204 /02360
- ^{1} French Land Register data, which excludes lakes, ponds, glaciers > 1 km^{2} (0.386 sq mi or 247 acres) and river estuaries.

Coingt is a commune in the Aisne department in Hauts-de-France in northern France.

== Population ==
Historical population
Year	Pop.	±% p.a.
1968	144	—
1975	121	−2.46%
1982	121	+0.00%
1990	113	−0.85%
1999	73	−4.74%
2007	80	+1.15%
2012	74	−1.55%
2017	68	−1.68%
2023	61	−1.79%
Source: INSEE

== See also ==
- Communes of the Aisne department
