= Jeantes =

- Commune
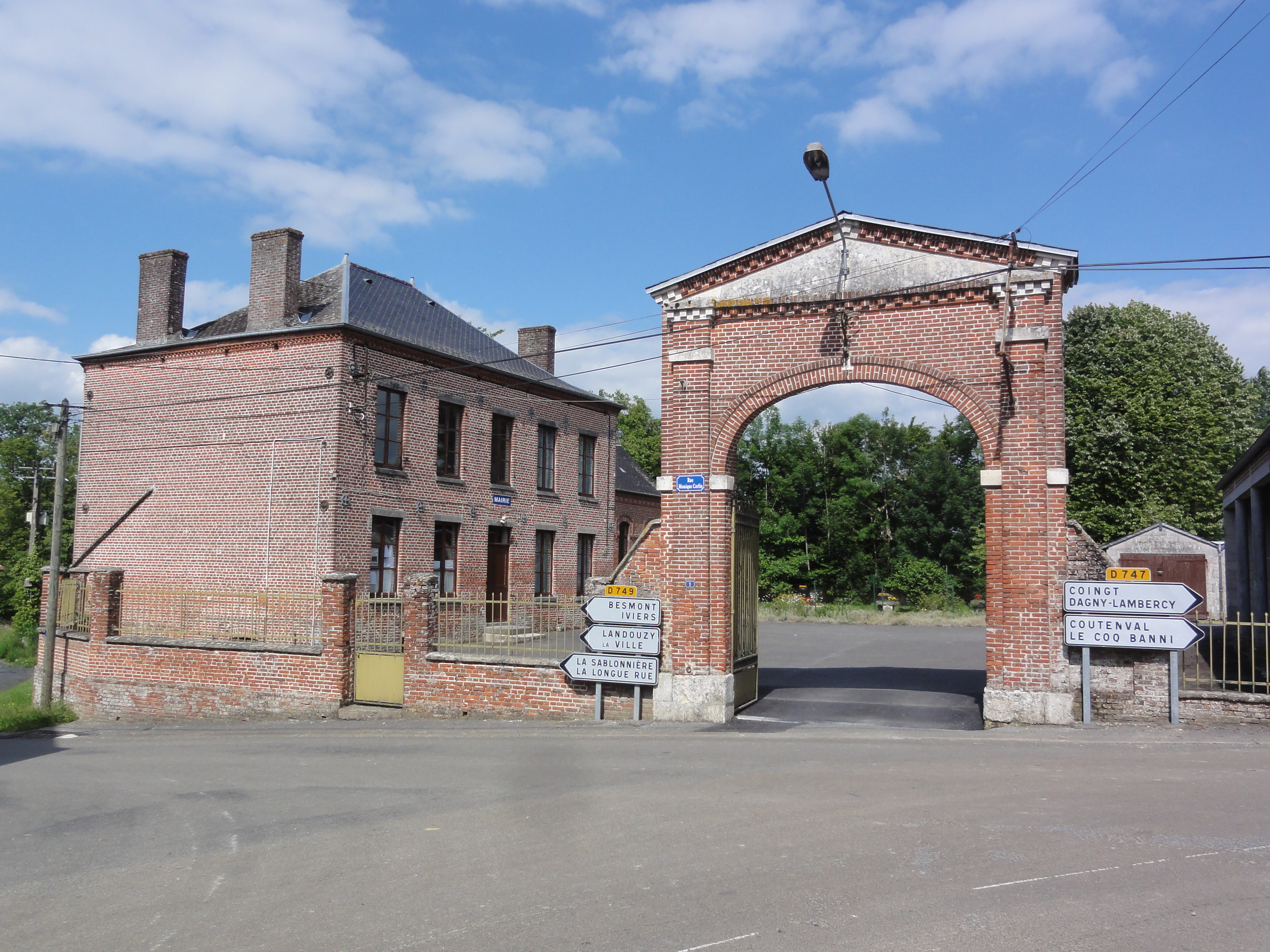
- The town hall of Jeantes
- Location of Jeantes
- Location within France Location within Hauts-de-France
- Coordinates: 49°48′16″N 4°03′21″E
- Country: France
- Region: Hauts-de-France
- Department: Aisne
- Arrondissement: Vervins
- Canton: Hirson
- Intercommunality: CC Trois Rivières

Government
  - Mayor (2026–32): Sylvain Bourgeois
- Area^{1}: 15.61 km^{2} (6.03 sq mi)
- Elevation: 200 m (660 ft)
- Highest elevation: 231 m (758 ft)
- Lowest elevation: 153 m (502 ft)
- Population (2023): 229
  - Density: 14.7/km^{2} (38.0/sq mi)
- Time zone: UTC+01:00 (CET)
  - Summer (DST): UTC+02:00 (CEST)
- INSEE/Postal code: 02391 /02140
- ^{1} French Land Register data, which excludes lakes, ponds, glaciers > 1 km^{2} (0.386 sq mi or 247 acres) and river estuaries.

Jeantes (French pronunciation: [ʒɑ̃t]) is a commune in the Aisne department in Hauts-de-France in northern France.

== History ==
It has been concluded that the area was occupied during the Gallic and Gallo-Roman times due to remains found nearby. The names "Jantha" or "Janta-Curtis" were used during the 12th century. In the 17th century, under the lordship of the Clairfontaine Abbey, the village (at the time named "Jeante-la-Ville") belonged to the Counts of Apremont until the French Revolution.

== Population ==
Historical population
Year	Pop.	±% p.a.
1968	316	—
1975	254	−3.07%
1982	236	−1.04%
1990	230	−0.32%
1999	213	−0.85%
2007	214	+0.06%
2012	223	+0.83%
2017	205	−1.67%
2023	229	+1.86%
Source: INSEE

== Places ==
The village contains the Church of St. Martin, a fortified church that has been classified as a Monument Historique since 1987. The church is visited by many tourists, but particularly Dutch people.

== See also ==
- Communes of the Aisne department
