= Landouzy-la-Ville =

- Commune
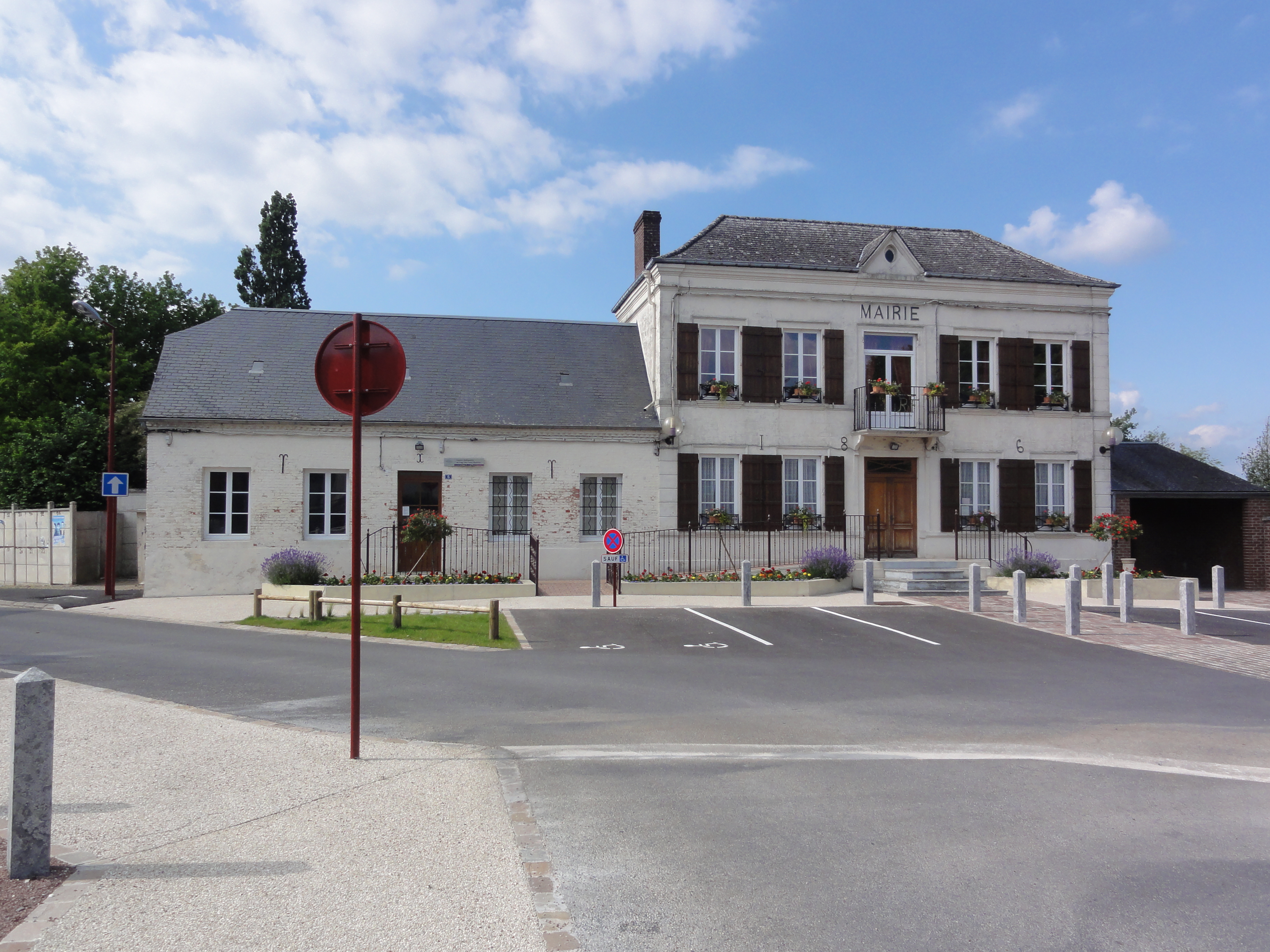
- The town hall of Landouzy-la-Ville
- Location of Landouzy-la-Ville
- Location within France Location within Hauts-de-France
- Coordinates: 49°51′43″N 4°02′56″E
- Country: France
- Region: Hauts-de-France
- Department: Aisne
- Arrondissement: Vervins
- Canton: Hirson
- Intercommunality: CC Trois Rivières

Government
  - Mayor (2026–32): Thierry Berthe
- Area^{1}: 15.76 km^{2} (6.08 sq mi)
- Elevation: 200 m (660 ft)
- Highest elevation: 234 m (768 ft)
- Lowest elevation: 148 m (486 ft)
- Population (2023): 503
  - Density: 31.9/km^{2} (82.7/sq mi)
- Time zone: UTC+01:00 (CET)
  - Summer (DST): UTC+02:00 (CEST)
- INSEE/Postal code: 02405 /02140
- ^{1} French Land Register data, which excludes lakes, ponds, glaciers > 1 km^{2} (0.386 sq mi or 247 acres) and river estuaries.

Landouzy-la-Ville (French pronunciation: [lɑ̃duzi la vil]) is a commune in the Aisne department in Hauts-de-France in northern France.

== Population ==
Historical population
Year	Pop.	±% p.a.
1968	596	—
1975	524	−1.82%
1982	518	−0.16%
1990	578	+1.38%
1999	530	−0.96%
2007	509	−0.50%
2012	566	+2.15%
2017	541	−0.90%
2023	503	−1.21%
Source: INSEE

== See also ==
- Communes of the Aisne department
