= Canton of Hirson =

Coordinates: 49°55′18″N 4°05′02″E

Hirson
- Canton
- Interactive map of Hirson
- Country: France
- Region: Hauts-de-France
- Department: Aisne
- No. of communes: {{{nbcomm}}}
- Area: 349.21 km^{2} (134.83 sq mi)
- Population (2023): 20,346
  - Density: 58.263/km^{2} (150.90/sq mi)
- INSEE code: 02 08

The canton of Hirson is an administrative division in northern France. At the French canton reorganisation which came into effect in March 2015, the canton was expanded from 13 to 26 communes:

1. Any-Martin-Rieux
2. Aubenton
3. Beaumé
4. Besmont
5. Bucilly
6. Buire
7. Coingt
8. Effry
9. Éparcy
10. La Hérie
11. Hirson
12. Iviers
13. Jeantes
14. Landouzy-la-Ville
15. Leuze
16. Logny-lès-Aubenton
17. Martigny
18. Mondrepuis
19. Mont-Saint-Jean
20. Neuve-Maison
21. Ohis
22. Origny-en-Thiérache
23. Saint-Michel
24. Watigny
25. Wimy
26. Saint-Clément

== Demographics ==
Historical population
| Year | Pop. | ±% p.a. |
|---|---|---|
| 2013 | 22,077 | — |
| 2018 | 21,171 | −0.83% |
Source: INSEE

== See also ==
- Cantons of the Aisne department
- Communes of France
