= Harcigny =

- Commune
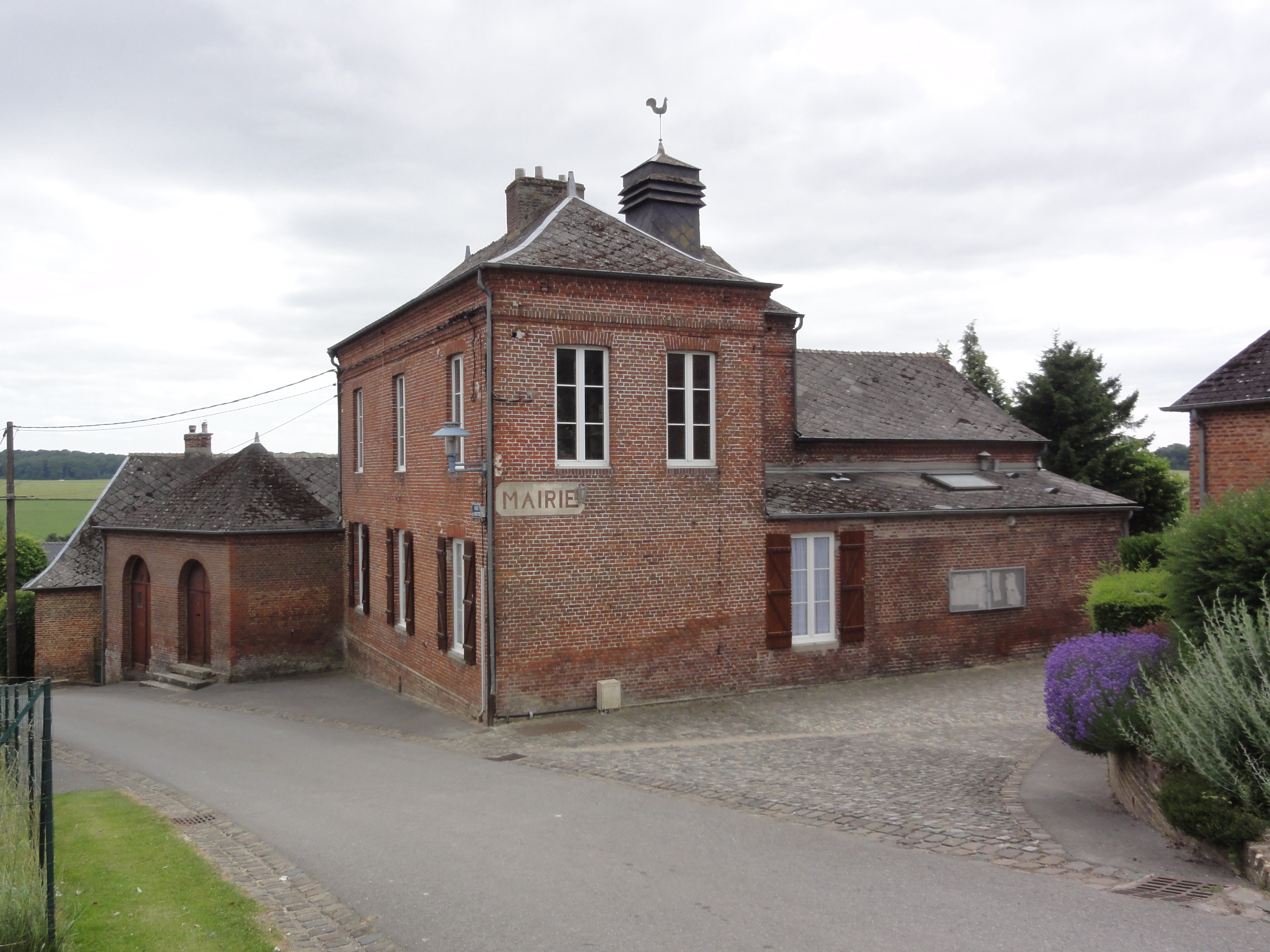
- The town hall of Harcigny
- Location of Harcigny
- Location within France Location within Hauts-de-France
- Coordinates: 49°47′48″N 3°58′56″E
- Country: France
- Region: Hauts-de-France
- Department: Aisne
- Arrondissement: Vervins
- Canton: Vervins
- Intercommunality: Thiérache du Centre

Government
  - Mayor (2026–32): Luc Michel
- Area^{1}: 7.57 km^{2} (2.92 sq mi)
- Elevation: 170 m (560 ft)
- Highest elevation: 211 m (692 ft)
- Lowest elevation: 117 m (384 ft)
- Population (2023): 244
  - Density: 32.2/km^{2} (83.5/sq mi)
- Time zone: UTC+01:00 (CET)
  - Summer (DST): UTC+02:00 (CEST)
- INSEE/Postal code: 02369 /02140
- ^{1} French Land Register data, which excludes lakes, ponds, glaciers > 1 km^{2} (0.386 sq mi or 247 acres) and river estuaries.

Harcigny (French pronunciation: [aʁsiɲi]) is a commune in the Aisne department in Hauts-de-France in northern France.

== Population ==
Historical population
Year	Pop.	±% p.a.
1968	249	—
1975	252	+0.17%
1982	264	+0.67%
1990	275	+0.51%
1999	264	−0.45%
2007	254	−0.48%
2012	247	−0.56%
2017	242	−0.41%
2023	244	+0.14%
Source: INSEE

== See also ==
- Communes of the Aisne department
