= Canton of Saint-Simon =

Coordinates: 49°44′34″N 3°10′22″E

Saint-Simon
- Former canton
- Interactive map of Saint-Simon
- Country: France
- Region: Hauts-de-France
- Department: Aisne
- No. of communes: {{{nbcomm}}}
- Disbanded: 2015
- Area: 153.02 km^{2} (59.08 sq mi)
- Population (2012): 11,852
  - Density: 77.454/km^{2} (200.60/sq mi)

The canton of Saint-Simon is a former administrative division in northern France. It was disbanded following the French canton reorganisation which came into effect in March 2015. It had 11,852 inhabitants (2012).

The canton comprised the following communes:

- Annois
- Artemps
- Aubigny-aux-Kaisnes
- Bray-Saint-Christophe
- Castres
- Clastres
- Contescourt
- Cugny
- Dallon
- Dury
- Flavy-le-Martel
- Fontaine-lès-Clercs
- Grugies
- Happencourt
- Jussy
- Montescourt-Lizerolles
- Ollezy
- Pithon
- Saint-Simon
- Seraucourt-le-Grand
- Sommette-Eaucourt
- Tugny-et-Pont
- Villers-Saint-Christophe

== Demographics ==
Historical population Canton of Saint-Simon
Year	1962	1968	1975	1982	1990	1999
Pop.	9,588	10,574	10,453	10,417	11,124	11,001
±%	—	+10.3%	−1.1%	−0.3%	+6.8%	−1.1%
From the year 1962 on: No double counting – residents of multiple communes (e.g. students and military personnel) are counted only once. Source: INSEE

== See also ==
- Cantons of the Aisne department
