= Arrondissement of Saint-Quentin =

Coordinates: 49°51′N 3°16′E

Saint-Quentin
- Arrondissement
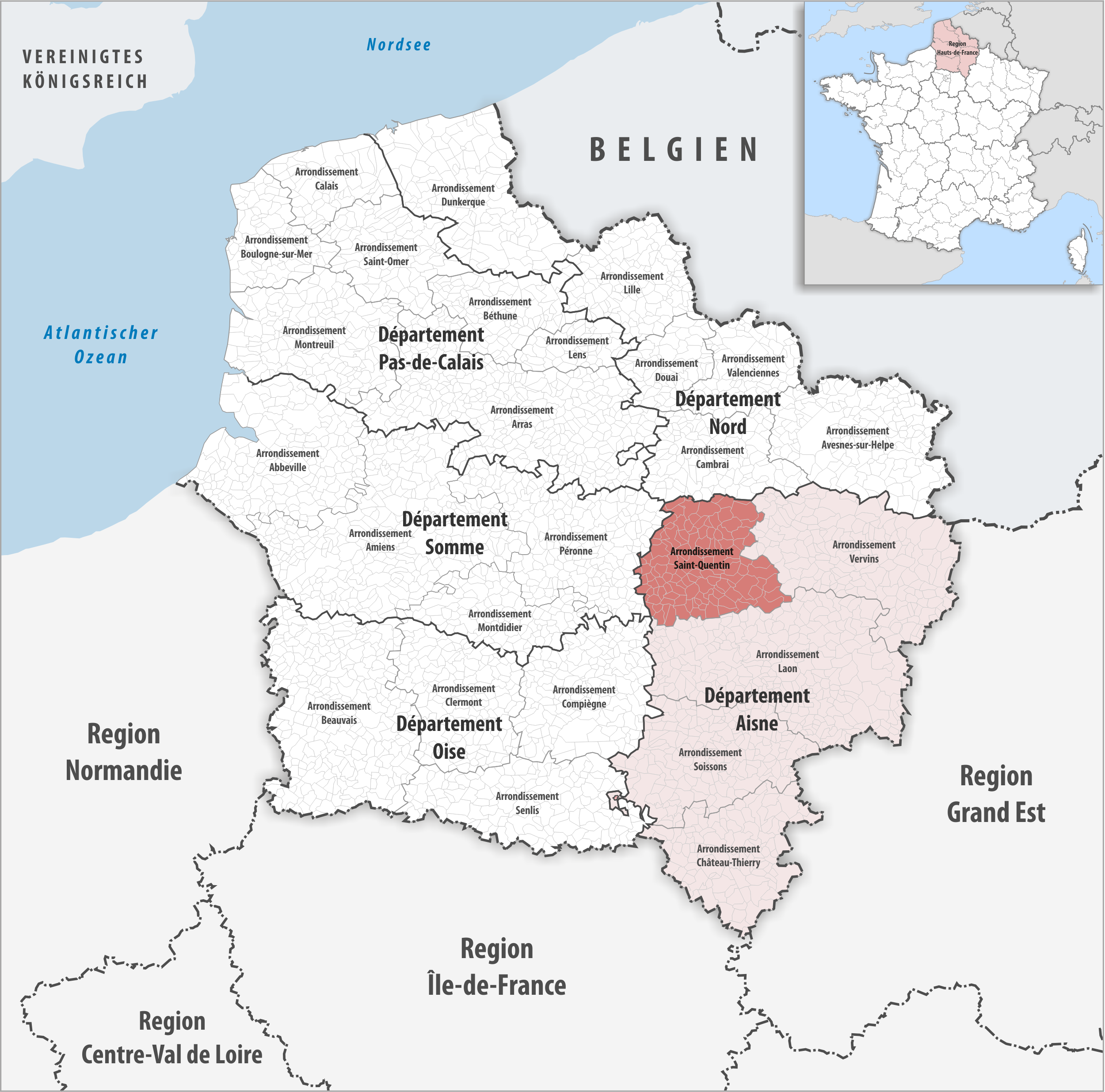
- Location within the region Hauts-de-France
- Country: France
- Region: Hauts-de-France
- Department: Aisne
- No. of communes: {{{nbcomm}}}
- Area: 1,071.2 km^{2} (413.6 sq mi)
- Population (2023): 125,503
  - Density: 117.16/km^{2} (303.45/sq mi)
- INSEE code: 023

The arrondissement of Saint-Quentin is an arrondissement of France in the Aisne department in the Hauts-de-France region. It has 126 communes. Its population is 126,366 (2021), and its area is 1,071.2 km^{2} (413.6 sq mi).

== Composition ==
The communes of the arrondissement of Saint-Quentin, and their INSEE codes are:

1. Alaincourt (02009)
2. Annois (02019)
3. Artemps (02025)
4. Attilly (02029)
5. Aubencheul-aux-Bois (02030)
6. Aubigny-aux-Kaisnes (02032)
7. Beaurevoir (02057)
8. Beauvois-en-Vermandois (02060)
9. Becquigny (02061)
10. Bellenglise (02063)
11. Bellicourt (02065)
12. Benay (02066)
13. Berthenicourt (02075)
14. Bohain-en-Vermandois (02095)
15. Bony (02100)
16. Brancourt-le-Grand (02112)
17. Bray-Saint-Christophe (02117)
18. Brissay-Choigny (02123)
19. Brissy-Hamégicourt (02124)
20. Castres (02142)
21. Le Catelet (02143)
22. Caulaincourt (02144)
23. Cerizy (02149)
24. Châtillon-sur-Oise (02170)
25. Chevresis-Monceau (02184)
26. Clastres (02199)
27. Contescourt (02214)
28. Croix-Fonsomme (02240)
29. Cugny (02246)
30. Dallon (02257)
31. Douchy (02270)
32. Dury (02273)
33. Essigny-le-Grand (02287)
34. Essigny-le-Petit (02288)
35. Estrées (02291)
36. Étaves-et-Bocquiaux (02293)
37. Étreillers (02296)
38. Fayet (02303)
39. La Ferté-Chevresis (02306)
40. Fieulaine (02310)
41. Flavy-le-Martel (02315)
42. Fluquières (02317)
43. Fonsomme (02319)
44. Fontaine-lès-Clercs (02320)
45. Fontaine-Notre-Dame (02322)
46. Fontaine-Uterte (02323)
47. Foreste (02327)
48. Francilly-Selency (02330)
49. Fresnoy-le-Grand (02334)
50. Gauchy (02340)
51. Germaine (02343)
52. Gibercourt (02345)
53. Gouy (02352)
54. Gricourt (02355)
55. Grugies (02359)
56. Happencourt (02367)
57. Hargicourt (02370)
58. Harly (02371)
59. Hinacourt (02380)
60. Holnon (02382)
61. Homblières (02383)
62. Itancourt (02387)
63. Jeancourt (02390)
64. Joncourt (02392)
65. Jussy (02397)
66. Lanchy (02402)
67. Lehaucourt (02374)
68. Lempire (02417)
69. Lesdins (02420)
70. Levergies (02426)
71. Ly-Fontaine (02446)
72. Magny-la-Fosse (02451)
73. Maissemy (02452)
74. Marcy (02459)
75. Mesnil-Saint-Laurent (02481)
76. Mézières-sur-Oise (02483)
77. Montbrehain (02500)
78. Mont-d'Origny (02503)
79. Montescourt-Lizerolles (02504)
80. Montigny-en-Arrouaise (02511)
81. Morcourt (02525)
82. Moÿ-de-l'Aisne (02532)
83. Nauroy (02539)
84. Neuville-Saint-Amand (02549)
85. Neuvillette (02552)
86. Ollezy (02570)
87. Omissy (02571)
88. Origny-Sainte-Benoite (02575)
89. Parpeville (02592)
90. Pithon (02604)
91. Pleine-Selve (02605)
92. Pontru (02614)
93. Pontruet (02615)
94. Prémont (02618)
95. Ramicourt (02635)
96. Regny (02636)
97. Remaucourt (02637)
98. Remigny (02639)
99. Renansart (02640)
100. Ribemont (02648)
101. Roupy (02658)
102. Rouvroy (02659)
103. Saint-Quentin (02691)
104. Saint-Simon (02694)
105. Savy (02702)
106. Seboncourt (02703)
107. Sequehart (02708)
108. Serain (02709)
109. Seraucourt-le-Grand (02710)
110. Séry-lès-Mézières (02717)
111. Sissy (02721)
112. Sommette-Eaucourt (02726)
113. Surfontaine (02732)
114. Thenelles (02741)
115. Trefcon (02747)
116. Tugny-et-Pont (02752)
117. Urvillers (02756)
118. Vaux-en-Vermandois (02772)
119. Vendelles (02774)
120. Vendeuil (02775)
121. Vendhuile (02776)
122. Le Verguier (02782)
123. Vermand (02785)
124. Villeret (02808)
125. Villers-le-Sec (02813)
126. Villers-Saint-Christophe (02815)

== History ==
The arrondissement of Saint-Quentin was created in 1800.

As a result of the reorganisation of the cantons of France which came into effect in 2015, the borders of the cantons are no longer related to the borders of the arrondissements. The cantons of the arrondissement of Saint-Quentin were, as of January 2015:

1. Bohain-en-Vermandois
2. Le Catelet
3. Moÿ-de-l'Aisne
4. Ribemont
5. Saint-Quentin-Centre
6. Saint-Quentin-Nord
7. Saint-Quentin-Sud
8. Saint-Simon
9. Vermand

== Sub-prefects ==
- Paul Joseph Boudier (1854–1908) : 1885
