= Eaucourt =

Eaucourt is part of the name of several communes in France:

- Eaucourt-sur-Somme, in the Somme département
- Sommette-Eaucourt, in the Aisne département
- Warlencourt-Eaucourt, in the Pas-de-Calais département
