= Artemps =

- Commune
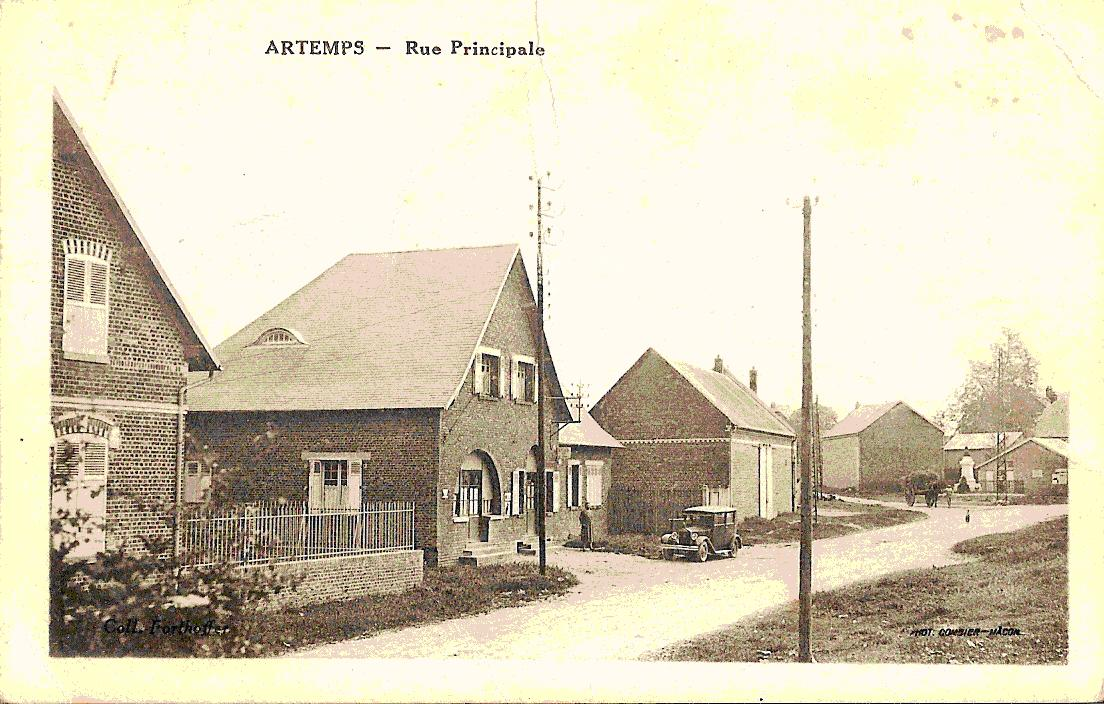
- Rue du canal
- Location of Artemps
- Location within France Location within Hauts-de-France
- Coordinates: 49°45′57″N 3°11′26″E
- Country: France
- Region: Hauts-de-France
- Department: Aisne
- Arrondissement: Saint-Quentin
- Canton: Ribemont
- Intercommunality: CA Saint-Quentinois

Government
  - Mayor (2026–32): Jean-François Dusanter
- Area^{1}: 6.31 km^{2} (2.44 sq mi)
- Elevation: 77 m (253 ft)
- Highest elevation: 93 m (305 ft)
- Lowest elevation: 62 m (203 ft)
- Population (2023): 361
  - Density: 57.2/km^{2} (148/sq mi)
- Time zone: UTC+01:00 (CET)
  - Summer (DST): UTC+02:00 (CEST)
- INSEE/Postal code: 02025 /02480
- ^{1} French Land Register data, which excludes lakes, ponds, glaciers > 1 km^{2} (0.386 sq mi or 247 acres) and river estuaries.

Artemps is a commune in the department of Aisne in the Hauts-de-France region of northern France.

== Geography ==
Artemps is located 10 km southwest of Saint-Quentin and 7 km northeast of Ham. It can be accessed by the D32 road from Saint-Simon in the south passing through the heart of the commune and the village and continuing to Seraucourt-le-Grand in the north. There are a few country roads in the commune and the old Saint-Simon – Clastres Air Base is in the southeast of the commune. The commune is mostly farmland with a forest belt along the whole northern border.

The Somme river flows along the northern border forming part of the border and the Canal of Saint-Quentin passes through parallel to the river inside the commune.

== Administration ==
List of Successive Mayors of Artemps

From	To	Name	Party
2001	2014	Jean-Claude Dusanter	DVD
2014	2020	Bernard Beudin	
2020	2026	Jean-Claude Dusanter	DVD
2026	Present	Jean-François Dusanter	

== Population ==
Historical population
Year	Pop.	±% p.a.
1968	289	—
1975	292	+0.15%
1982	297	+0.24%
1990	347	+1.96%
1999	338	−0.29%
2007	356	+0.65%
2012	360	+0.22%
2017	371	+0.60%
2023	361	−0.45%
Source: INSEE

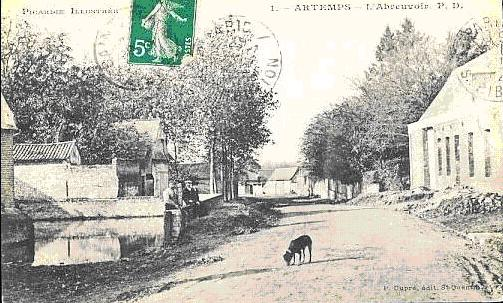
The Rue du Canal

== Sites and Monuments ==
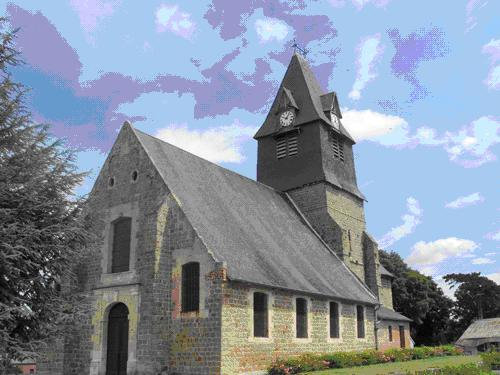
Saint Martin's Church in Artemps

St. Martin's Church

This church is one of the few in France to have a steeple topped by two cocks. The church has undergone many changes over the years but was not completely destroyed during the two world wars. Most windows have been preserved and on one of them the master glassmaker represented the church.

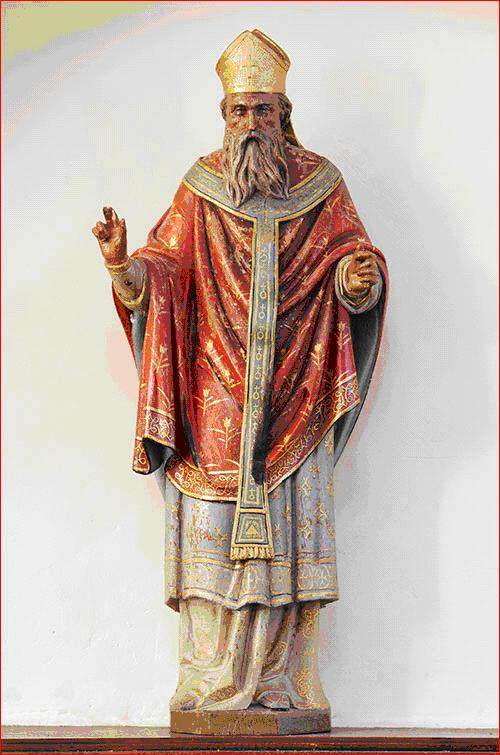
Statue of Saint Pierre in the church

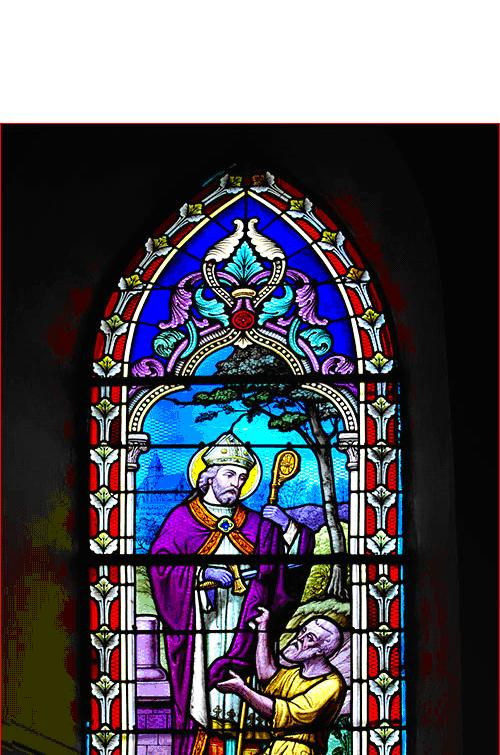
Stained glass window in the church

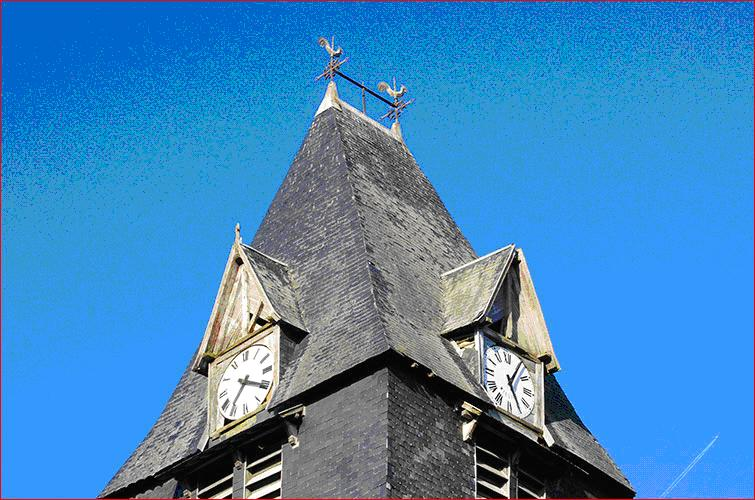
The steeple with its two cocks

== See also ==
- Communes of the Aisne department
