= Boudier =

Boudier is a French occupational surname with Germanic roots meaning "army messenger". Notable people with this surname include:

- George Boudier (1820–1899), English cricketer and Anglican priest; served as a military chaplain in the Crimean War
- Jean Louis Émile Boudier (1828–1920), French pharmacist and mycologist
- Paul Joseph Boudier (1854–1908), French civil servant.
