= Aubigny-aux-Kaisnes =

- Commune
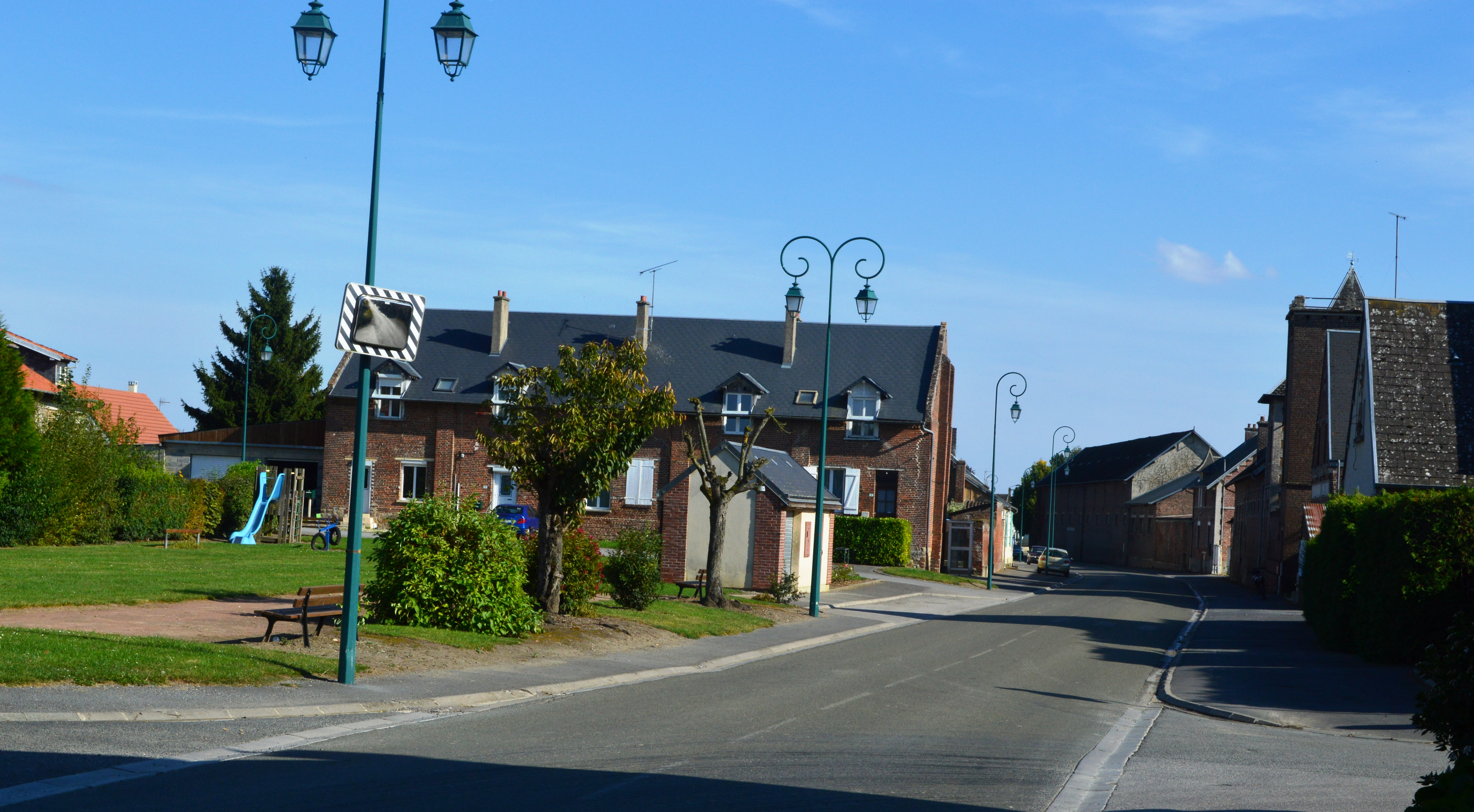
- Location of Aubigny-aux-Kaisnes
- Location within France Location within Hauts-de-France
- Coordinates: 49°46′27″N 3°07′03″E
- Country: France
- Region: Hauts-de-France
- Department: Aisne
- Arrondissement: Saint-Quentin
- Canton: Ribemont
- Intercommunality: CA Saint-Quentinois

Government
  - Mayor (2026–32): Sylvain Van Heeswyck
- Area^{1}: 3.72 km^{2} (1.44 sq mi)
- Highest elevation: 96 m (315 ft)
- Lowest elevation: 75 m (246 ft)
- Population (2023): 231
  - Density: 62.1/km^{2} (161/sq mi)
- Time zone: UTC+01:00 (CET)
  - Summer (DST): UTC+02:00 (CEST)
- INSEE/Postal code: 02032 /02590
- ^{1} French Land Register data, which excludes lakes, ponds, glaciers > 1 km^{2} (0.386 sq mi or 247 acres) and river estuaries.

Aubigny-aux-Kaisnes (French pronunciation: [obiɲi o kɛn]) is a commune in the department of Aisne in the Hauts-de-France region of northern France.

== Geography ==
Aubigny-aux-Kaisnes is located some 15 km southwest of Saint-Quentin and 5 km northeast of Ham. It can be accessed by road D930 which runs northeast from Ham and inside the northwestern border of the commune towards Saint-Quentin. The D34 road also comes from Foreste in the northwest through the village and continuing to Bray-Saint-Christophe in the east. There is also a country road heading west from the village to Villers-Saint-Christophe. The commune consists entirely of farmland with no other villages or hamlets.

== Administration ==
List of Successive Mayors of Aubigny-aux-Kaisnes

From	To	Name	Party
1959	2001	Pierre Martine	
2001	Present	Sylvain van Heeswyck	UMP then LR

== Population ==
Historical population
Year	Pop.	±% p.a.
1968	291	—
1975	262	−1.49%
1982	279	+0.90%
1990	263	−0.74%
1999	271	+0.33%
2007	243	−1.35%
2012	239	−0.33%
2017	253	+1.15%
2023	231	−1.50%
Source: INSEE

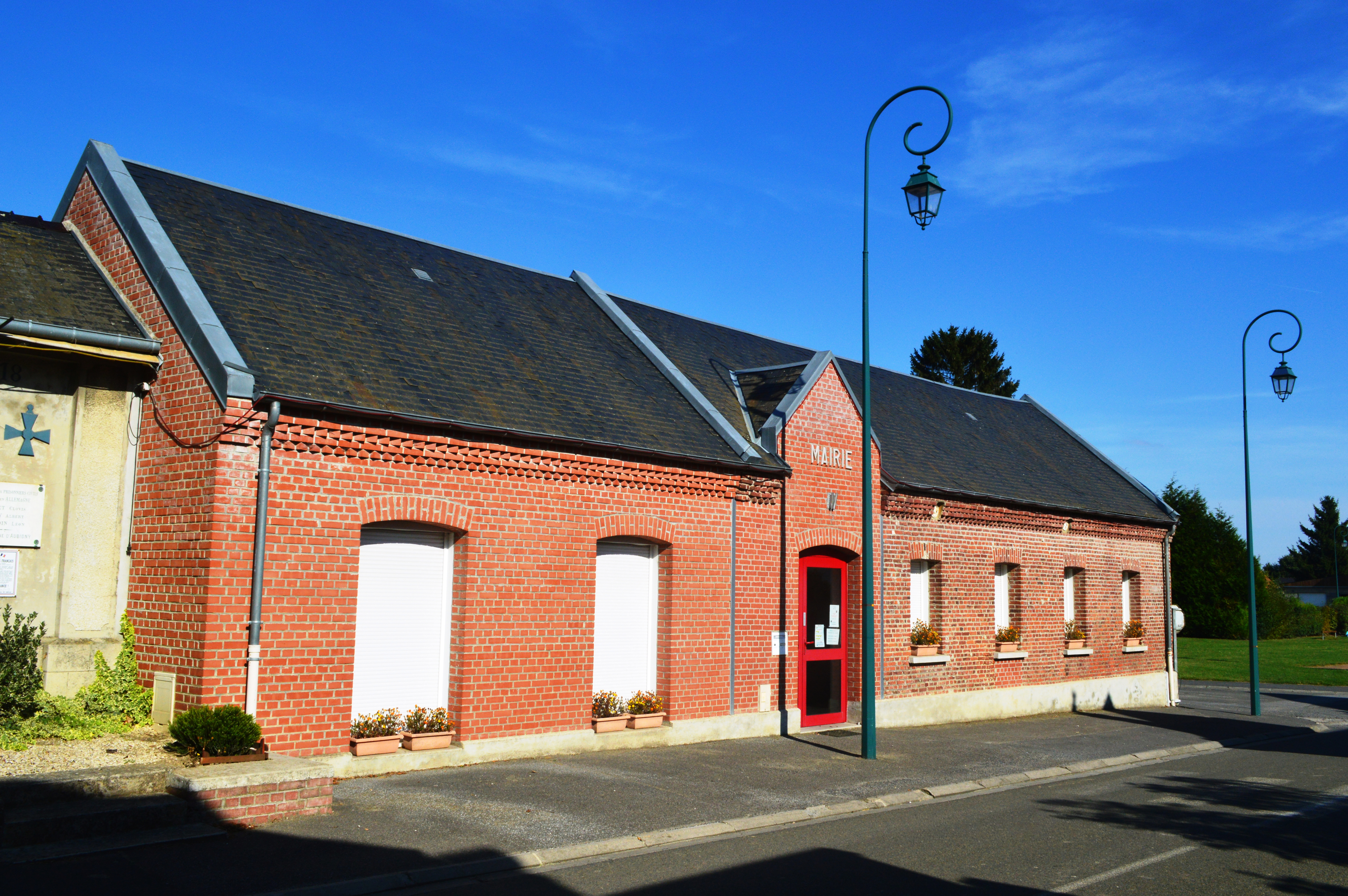
The Town Hall

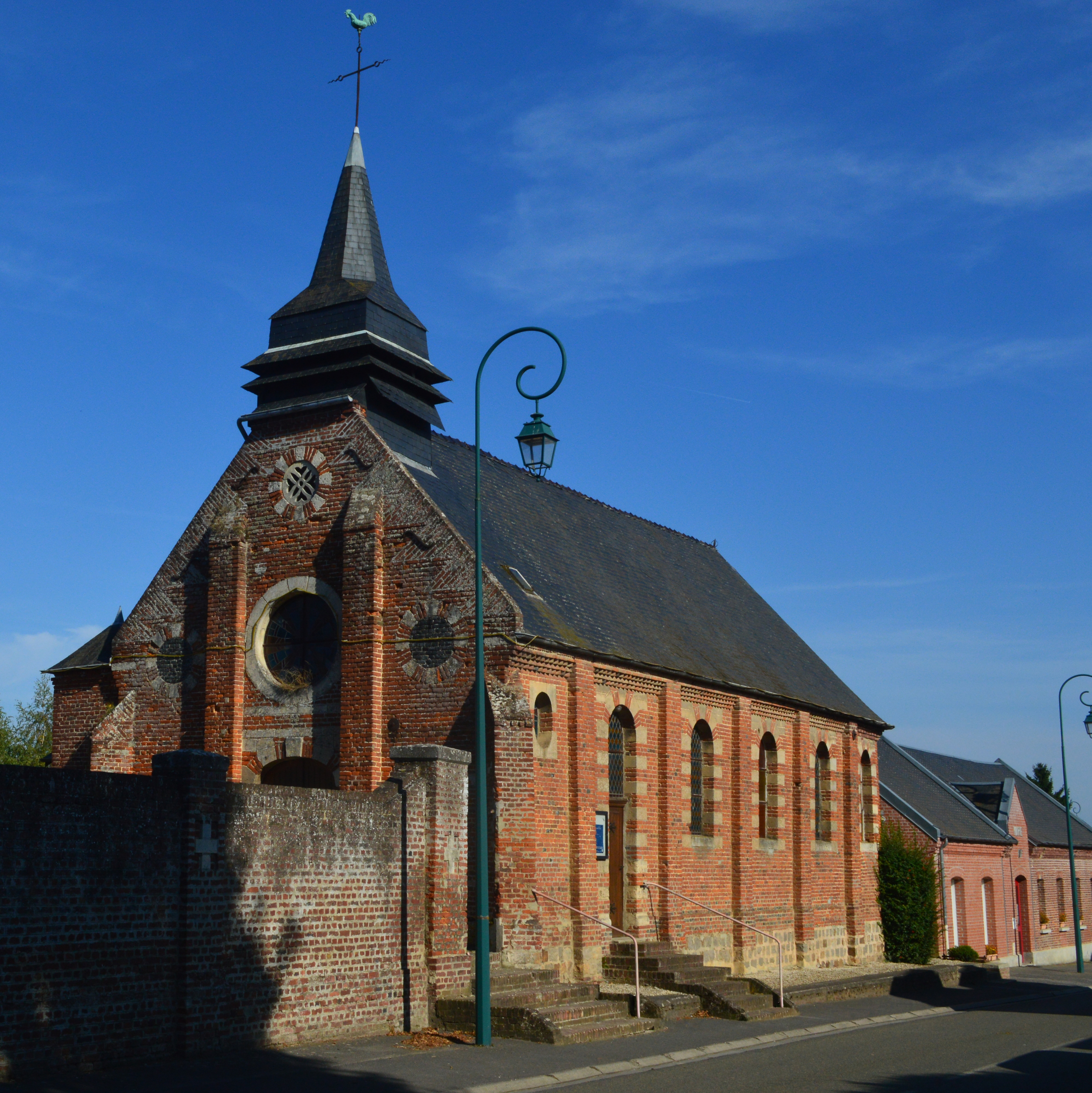
Aubigny-aux-Kaisnes Church

== Notable people linked to the commune ==
- Augustin Ringeval, racing cyclist who participated in the Tour de France from 1905 to 1913. Born on 13 April 1882 in Aubigny-aux-Kaisnes, he died aged 85 in Amélie-les-Bains on 5 July 1967

== See also ==
- Communes of the Aisne department
