= Somme Canal =

Canal in northern France

Coordinates: 50°11′N 1°39′E

Canal de la Somme
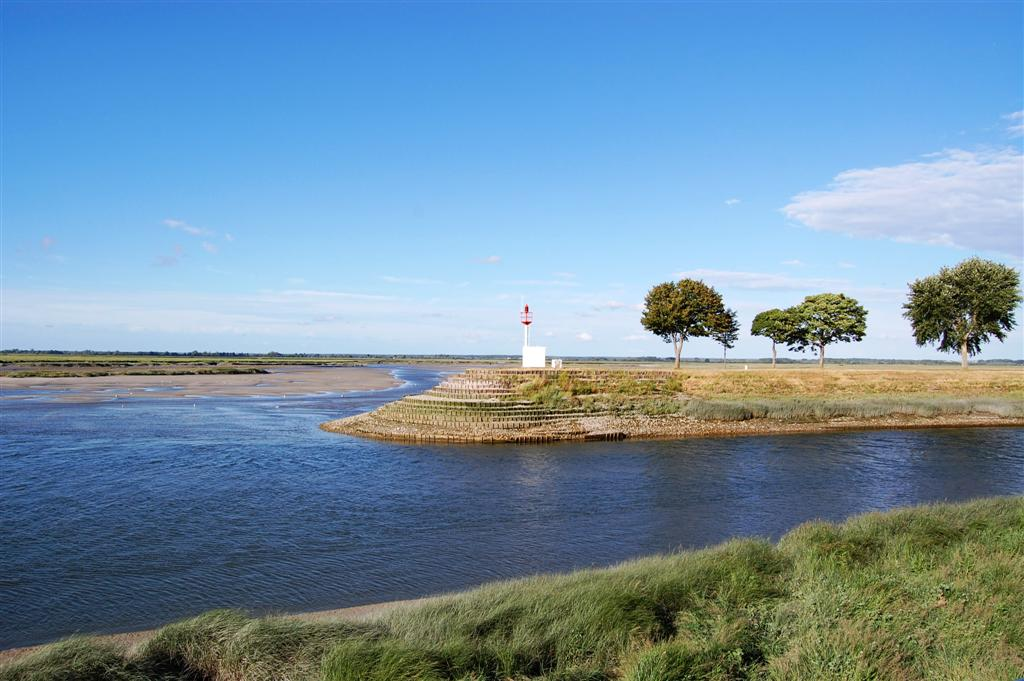
- The entrance of the Canal de la Somme from the English Channel at Saint-Valéry-sur-Somme

Specifications
- Length: 156.4 km (97.2 mi)
- Locks: 25
- Total rise: 66 m (217 ft)

History
- Construction began: 1770
- Date completed: 1843

Geography
- Start point: English Channel at Saint-Valery-sur-Somme
- End point: Canal de Saint-Quentin at St. Simon
- Connects to: Canal de Saint-Quentin but disused Canal du Nord

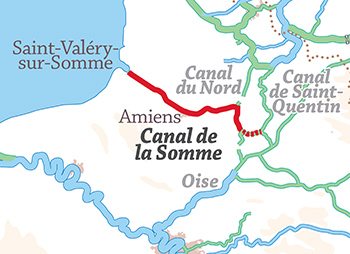
Location of Canal de la Somme, showing the upstream section disused; middle section shared with Canal du Nord

The Canal de la Somme (French pronunciation: [kanal də la sɔm]) is a canal in northern France. Its total length is 156.4 km with 25 locks, from the English Channel at Saint-Valéry-sur-Somme to the Canal de Saint-Quentin at Saint-Simon.

== History ==
The Somme River was canalized beginning in 1770. The 54 km section from St. Simon to Bray was completed by 1772, but the rest was not finished until 1843.

== Overview ==
The canal as originally built has seen substantial modifications since construction of the Canal du Nord in 1904–1965, and is now made up of four distinct sections:

- 14.2 km (8.8 mi) and 1 lock from Saint-Valery-sur-Somme to Abbeville (the Canal maritime)
- 105.3 km (65.4 mi) and 18 locks from Abbeville to Péronne
- 20.3 km (12.6 mi) with 2 locks the section upgraded as part of the Canal du Nord
- 16.4 km (10.2 mi) and 4 locks from Voyennes to Saint-Simon, closed upstream from Offoy since 2004.

Some authors distinguish the Grande Somme downstream from Péronne and the Petite Somme upstream from Voyennes. Since 2005 the latter section has been closed to navigation as a result of silt deposits.

In the 1960s, more than 300,000 tonnes of goods were transported on the canal. Today it is used largely by pleasure boats.

== En Route ==
- PK 156 Saint-Valéry-sur-Somme
- PK 141 Abbeville
- PK 92 Amiens
- PK 34 Péronne
- PK 16 Voyennes
- PK 0 Saint-Simon

== See also ==
- List of canals in France
