= Annois =

- Commune
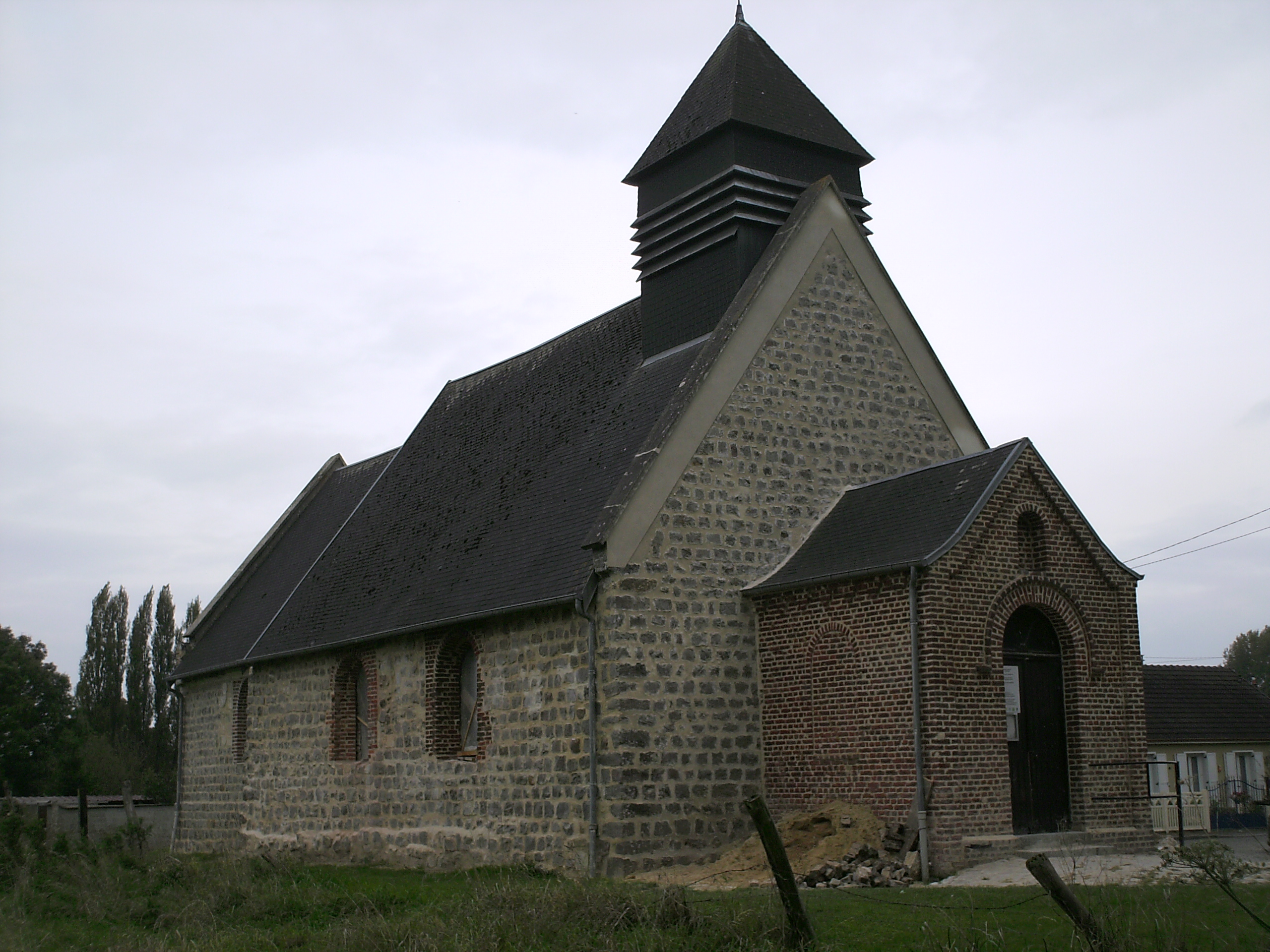
- Location of Annois
- Location within France Location within Hauts-de-France
- Coordinates: 49°43′18″N 3°10′42″E
- Country: France
- Region: Hauts-de-France
- Department: Aisne
- Arrondissement: Saint-Quentin
- Canton: Ribemont
- Intercommunality: CA Saint-Quentinois

Government
  - Mayor (2026–32): Hugues Demarest
- Area^{1}: 5.9 km^{2} (2.3 sq mi)
- Elevation: 65 m (213 ft)
- Highest elevation: 158 m (518 ft)
- Lowest elevation: 63 m (207 ft)
- Population (2023): 349
  - Density: 59/km^{2} (150/sq mi)
- Time zone: UTC+01:00 (CET)
  - Summer (DST): UTC+02:00 (CEST)
- INSEE/Postal code: 02019 /02480
- ^{1} French Land Register data, which excludes lakes, ponds, glaciers > 1 km^{2} (0.386 sq mi or 247 acres) and river estuaries.

Annois (French pronunciation: [anwa]) is a commune in the department of Aisne in the Hauts-de-France region of northern France.

== Geography ==
Annois is located some 33 km northwest of Laon and 30 km east of Roye. It is accessed by road D937 from Cugny in the west and continuing east to Flavy-le-Martel. There is also the D32 from Saint-Simon to Flavy-le-Martel passing through the northeast of the commune. Branching from this road is the D431 which goes to the village. A railway line passes through the heart of the commune from west to east but the nearest station is the Flavy-le-Martel station outside the eastern border of the commune. The commune is mostly farmland with some forest on the northern and southern edges of the commune.

The Canal de Saint-Quentin passes just to the north of the commune and there are large ponds in the north of the commune connected to the canal. A stream flows through the length of the commune from south to north connecting to the network of ponds.

== Administration ==
List of Mayors of Annois

From	To	Name	Party
2001	2020	Richard Telatynski	DVD
2020	Present	Hugues Demarest	

== Population ==
Historical population
Year	Pop.	±% p.a.
1968	345	—
1975	370	+1.00%
1982	397	+1.01%
1990	372	−0.81%
1999	383	+0.32%
2007	378	−0.16%
2012	387	+0.47%
2017	364	−1.22%
2023	349	−0.70%
Source: INSEE

== Personalities ==
Charles Augustus Pinguet (also called Badinguet) was born in Annois on 1 July 1826. On 1 February 1840 aged 14 he began working as a "cad" (valet service in the army) working as a painter on the maintenance of the Château de Ham. He became a friend of Prince Louis Napoleon Bonaparte during his imprisonment there for six years. On 25 May 1846 the future Napoleon III dressed in Pinguet's clothes: blue pants, blue cloth coat, hat, and shoes. Pinguet gave him a board soiled with lime mortar and plaster. On 25 May 1846 at six in the morning, Napoleon's escape began and he was in England by the next day.

== See also ==
- Communes of the Aisne department
