= Omissy =

- Commune
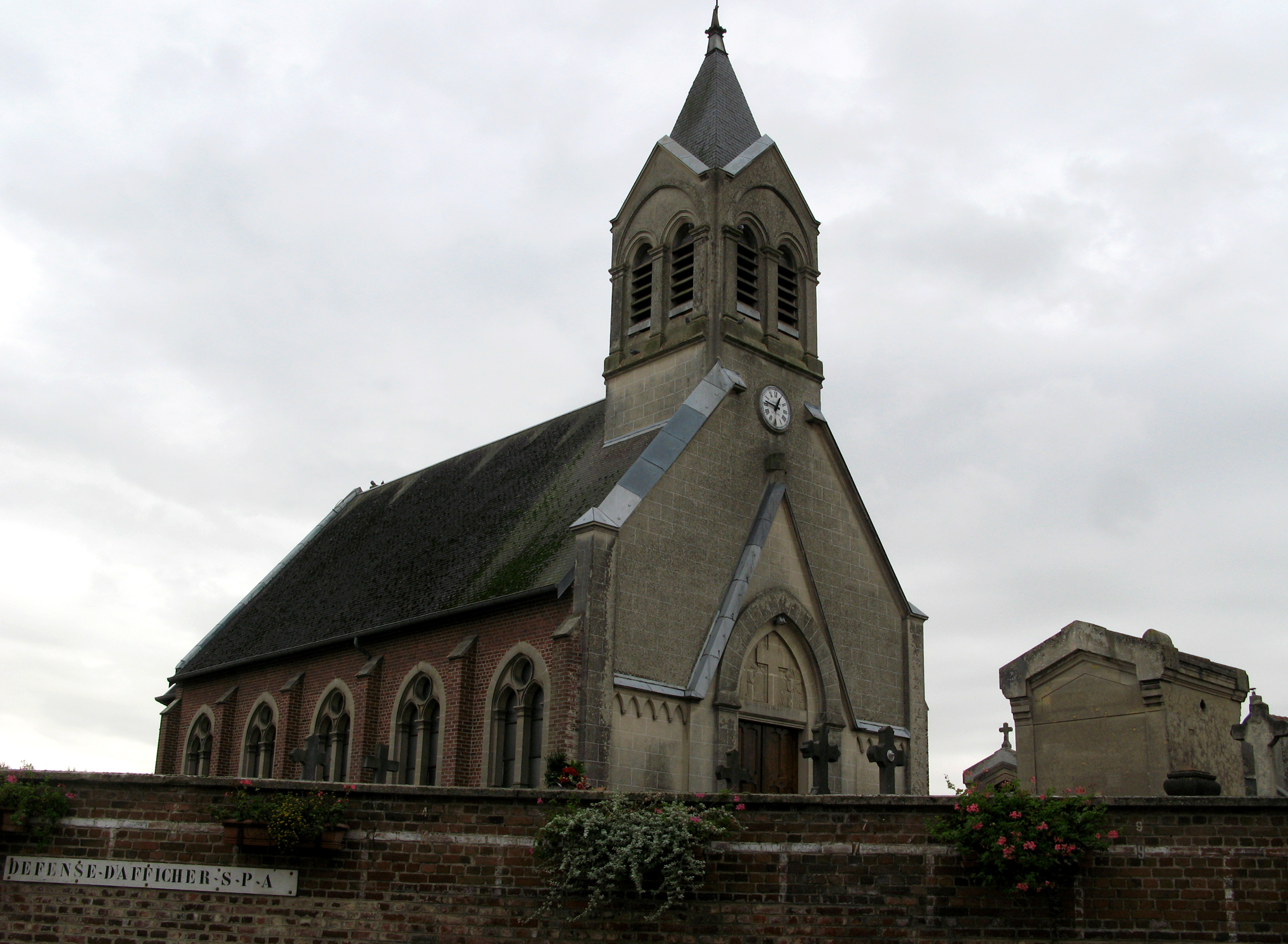
- The church of Omissy
- Location of Omissy
- Location within France Location within Hauts-de-France
- Coordinates: 49°52′42″N 3°18′46″E
- Country: France
- Region: Hauts-de-France
- Department: Aisne
- Arrondissement: Saint-Quentin
- Canton: Saint-Quentin-2
- Intercommunality: CA Saint-Quentinois

Government
  - Mayor (2026–32): Christophe Francois
- Area^{1}: 7.09 km^{2} (2.74 sq mi)
- Elevation: 82 m (269 ft)
- Highest elevation: 125 m (410 ft)
- Lowest elevation: 72 m (236 ft)
- Population (2023): 660
  - Density: 93/km^{2} (240/sq mi)
- Time zone: UTC+01:00 (CET)
  - Summer (DST): UTC+02:00 (CEST)
- INSEE/Postal code: 02571 /02100
- ^{1} French Land Register data, which excludes lakes, ponds, glaciers > 1 km^{2} (0.386 sq mi or 247 acres) and river estuaries.

Omissy (French pronunciation: [ɔmisi]) is a commune in the Aisne department in Hauts-de-France in northern France.

== Population ==
Historical population
Year	Pop.	±% p.a.
1968	345	—
1975	614	+8.58%
1982	697	+1.83%
1990	754	+0.99%
1999	745	−0.13%
2007	828	+1.33%
2012	748	−2.01%
2017	714	−0.93%
2023	660	−1.30%
Source: INSEE

== See also ==
- Communes of the Aisne department
