= Communauté d'agglomération du Saint-Quentinois =

Saint-Quentinois
- Communauté d'agglomération
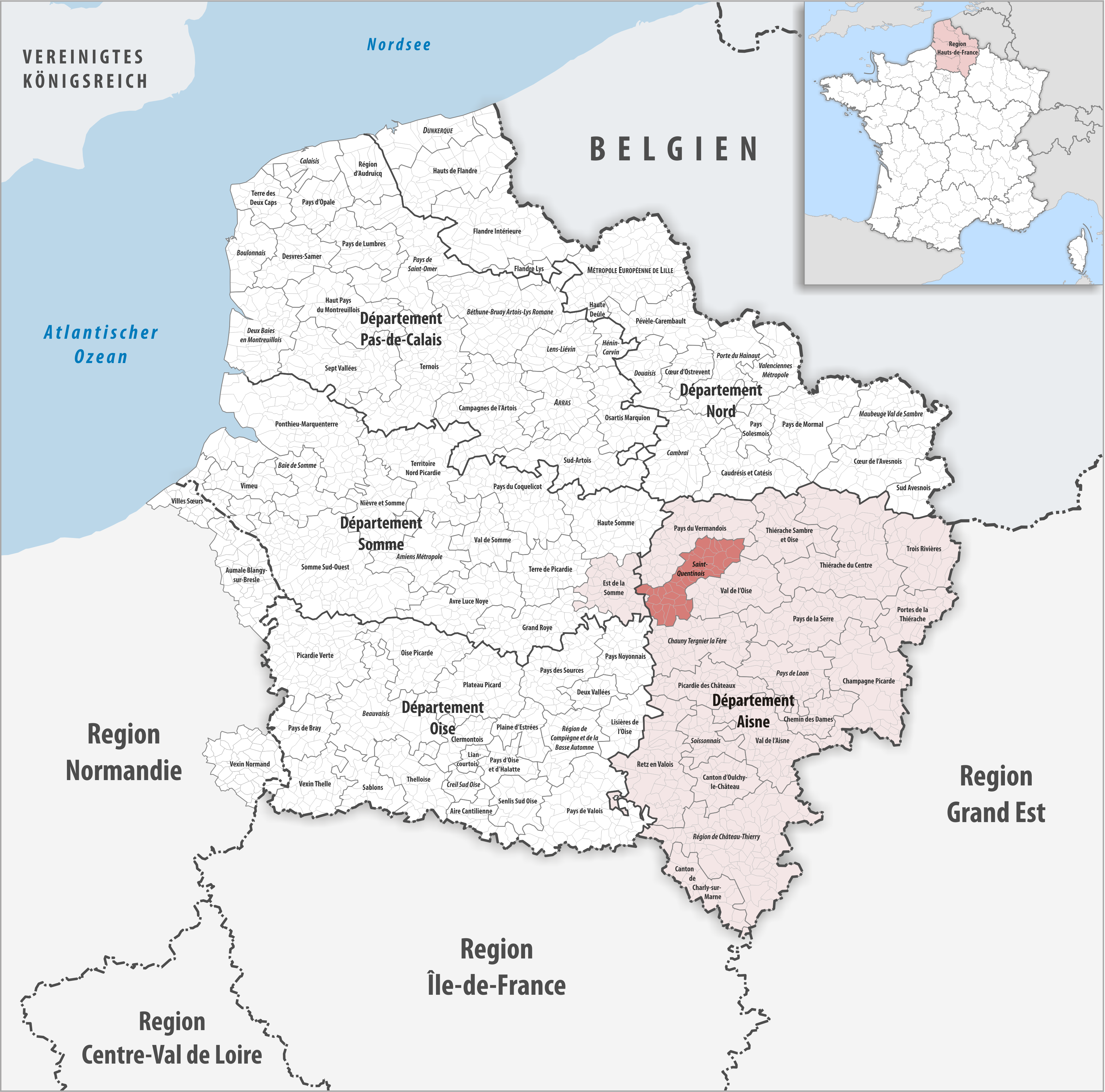
- Map of Saint-Quentin
- Interactive map of Saint-Quentinois
- Coordinates: 49°50′N 03°17′E
- Country: France
- Region: Hauts-de-France
- Department: Aisne
- No. of communes: {{{nbcomm}}}
- Established: 2017
- Area: 293.3 km^{2} (113.2 sq mi)
- Population (2019): 80,263
  - Density: 273.7/km^{2} (708.8/sq mi)
- Website: www.agglo-saintquentinois.fr

Communauté d'agglomération du Saint-Quentinois is the communauté d'agglomération, an intercommunal structure, centred on the city of Saint-Quentin. It is located in the Aisne department, in the Hauts-de-France region, northern France. Created in 2017, its seat is in Saint-Quentin. Its area is 293.3 km^{2}. Its population was 80,263 in 2019, of which 53,570 in Saint-Quentin proper.

== Composition ==
The communauté d'agglomération consists of the following 39 communes:

1. Annois
2. Artemps
3. Aubigny-aux-Kaisnes
4. Bray-Saint-Christophe
5. Castres
6. Clastres
7. Contescourt
8. Cugny
9. Dallon
10. Dury
11. Essigny-le-Petit
12. Fayet
13. Fieulaine
14. Flavy-le-Martel
15. Fonsomme
16. Fontaine-lès-Clercs
17. Fontaine-Notre-Dame
18. Gauchy
19. Grugies
20. Happencourt
21. Harly
22. Homblières
23. Jussy
24. Lesdins
25. Marcy
26. Mesnil-Saint-Laurent
27. Montescourt-Lizerolles
28. Morcourt
29. Neuville-Saint-Amand
30. Ollezy
31. Omissy
32. Remaucourt
33. Rouvroy
34. Saint-Quentin
35. Saint-Simon
36. Seraucourt-le-Grand
37. Sommette-Eaucourt
38. Tugny-et-Pont
39. Villers-Saint-Christophe
