= Neuville-Saint-Amand =

- Commune
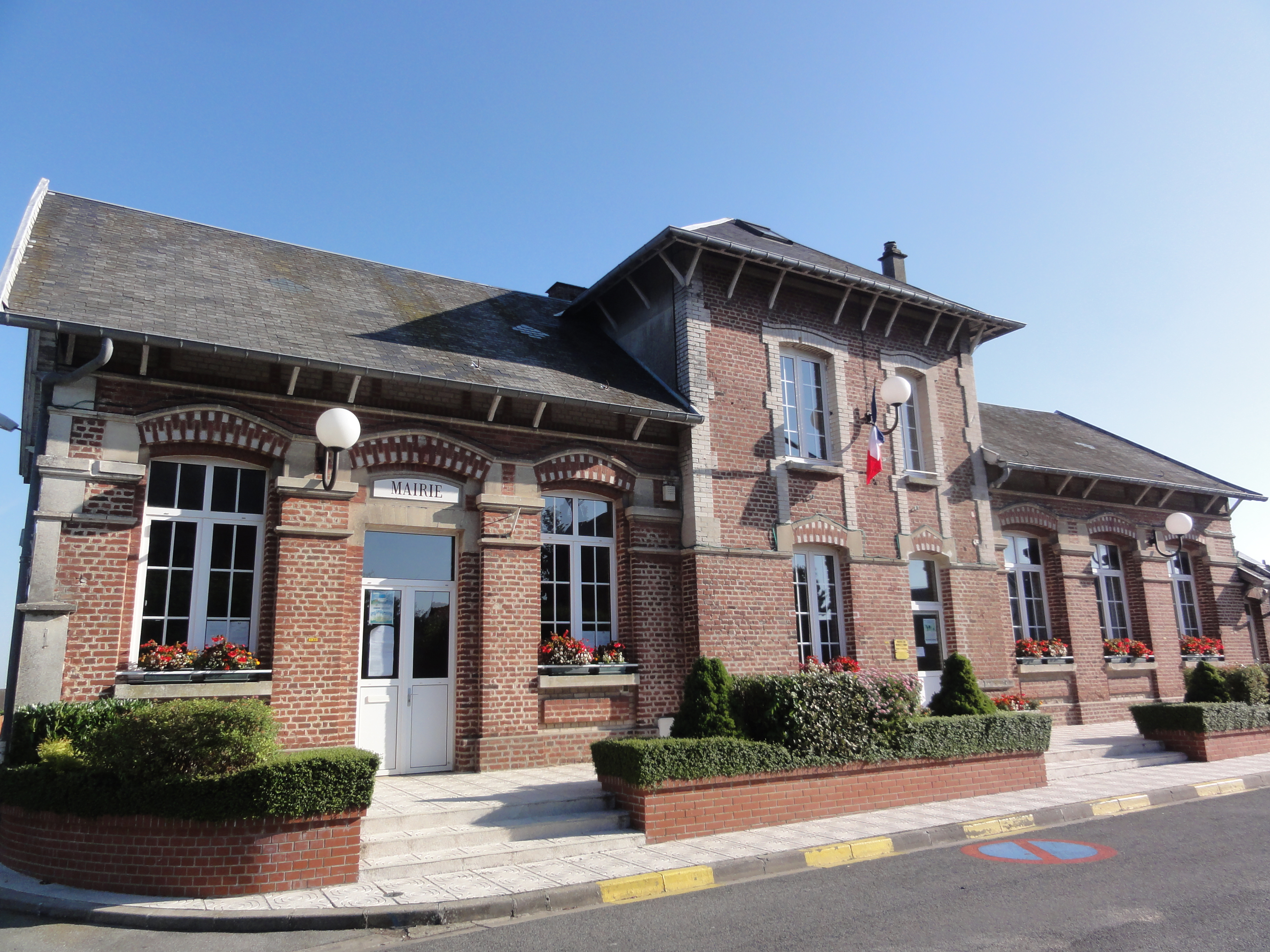
- The town hall of Neuville-Saint-Amand

- Coat of arms
- Location of Neuville-Saint-Amand
- Location within France Location within Hauts-de-France
- Coordinates: 49°49′36″N 3°20′05″E
- Country: France
- Region: Hauts-de-France
- Department: Aisne
- Arrondissement: Saint-Quentin
- Canton: Saint-Quentin-3
- Intercommunality: CA Saint-Quentinois

Government
  - Mayor (2026–32): Ghislain Henrion
- Area^{1}: 8.26 km^{2} (3.19 sq mi)
- Elevation: 121 m (397 ft)
- Highest elevation: 127 m (417 ft)
- Lowest elevation: 79 m (259 ft)
- Population (2023): 848
  - Density: 103/km^{2} (266/sq mi)
- Time zone: UTC+01:00 (CET)
  - Summer (DST): UTC+02:00 (CEST)
- INSEE/Postal code: 02549 /02100
- ^{1} French Land Register data, which excludes lakes, ponds, glaciers > 1 km^{2} (0.386 sq mi or 247 acres) and river estuaries.

Neuville-Saint-Amand (French pronunciation: [nøvil sɛ̃.t‿amɑ̃]) is a commune in the Aisne department in Hauts-de-France in northern France.

== Population ==
Historical population
Year	Pop.	±% p.a.
1968	870	—
1975	725	−2.57%
1982	732	+0.14%
1990	916	+2.84%
1999	908	−0.10%
2007	840	−0.97%
2012	882	+0.98%
2017	842	−0.92%
2023	848	+0.12%
Source: INSEE

== See also ==
- Communes of the Aisne department
