= Lesdins =

- Commune
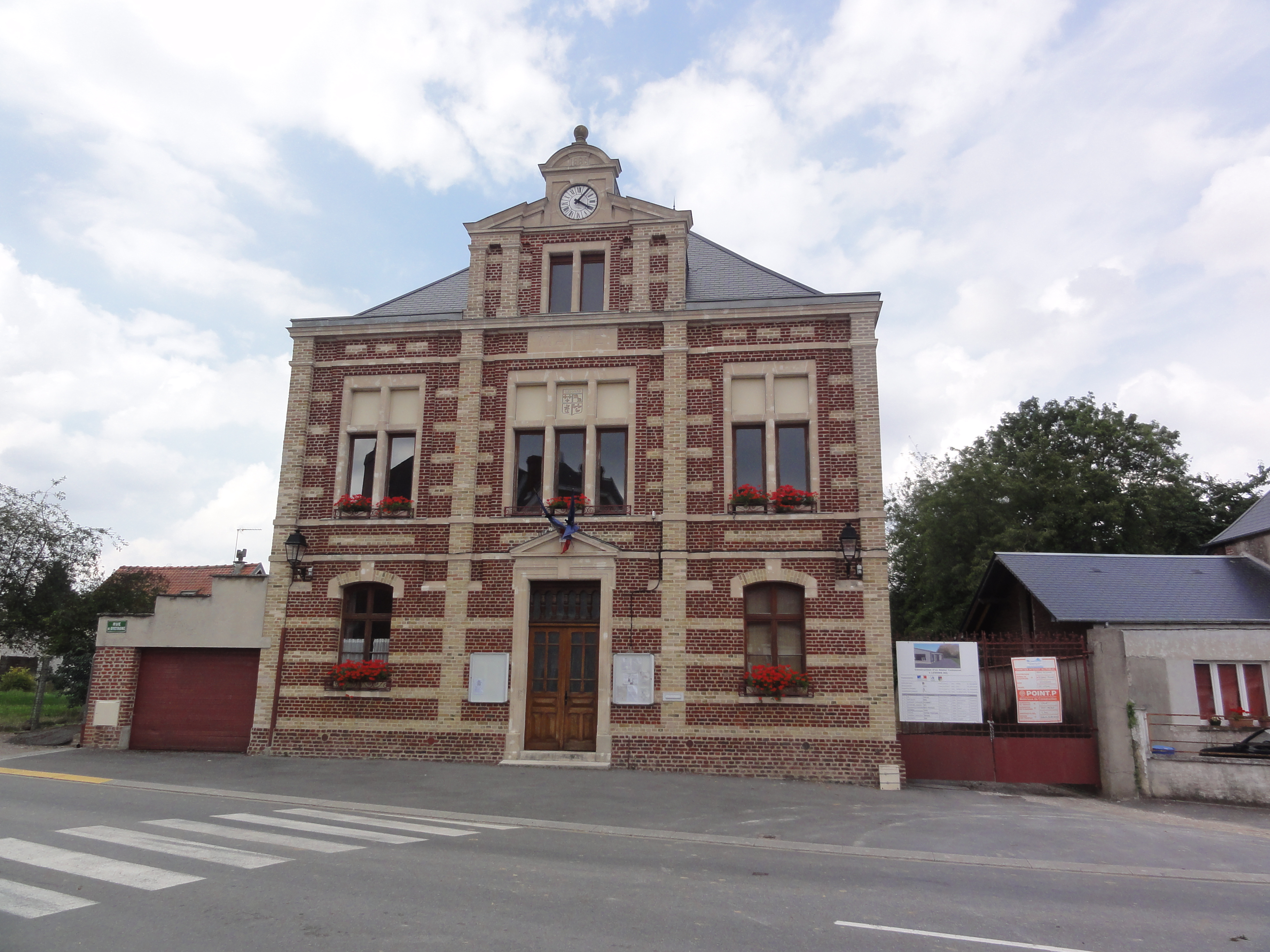
- The town hall of Lesdins

- Coat of arms
- Location of Lesdins
- Location within France Location within Hauts-de-France
- Coordinates: 49°53′51″N 3°19′41″E
- Country: France
- Region: Hauts-de-France
- Department: Aisne
- Arrondissement: Saint-Quentin
- Canton: Saint-Quentin-2
- Intercommunality: CA Saint-Quentinois

Government
  - Mayor (2026–32): Fabien Blondel
- Area^{1}: 10.63 km^{2} (4.10 sq mi)
- Elevation: 88 m (289 ft)
- Highest elevation: 139 m (456 ft)
- Lowest elevation: 76 m (249 ft)
- Population (2023): 790
  - Density: 74/km^{2} (190/sq mi)
- Time zone: UTC+01:00 (CET)
  - Summer (DST): UTC+02:00 (CEST)
- INSEE/Postal code: 02420 /02100
- ^{1} French Land Register data, which excludes lakes, ponds, glaciers > 1 km^{2} (0.386 sq mi or 247 acres) and river estuaries.

Lesdins (French pronunciation: [ledɛ̃]) is a commune in the Aisne department in Hauts-de-France in northern France.

== Population ==
Historical population
Year	Pop.	±% p.a.
1968	544	—
1975	546	+0.05%
1982	824	+6.06%
1990	855	+0.46%
1999	750	−1.45%
2007	804	+0.87%
2012	841	+0.90%
2017	832	−0.21%
2023	790	−0.86%
Source: INSEE

== See also ==
- Communes of the Aisne department
