= Fieulaine =

- Commune
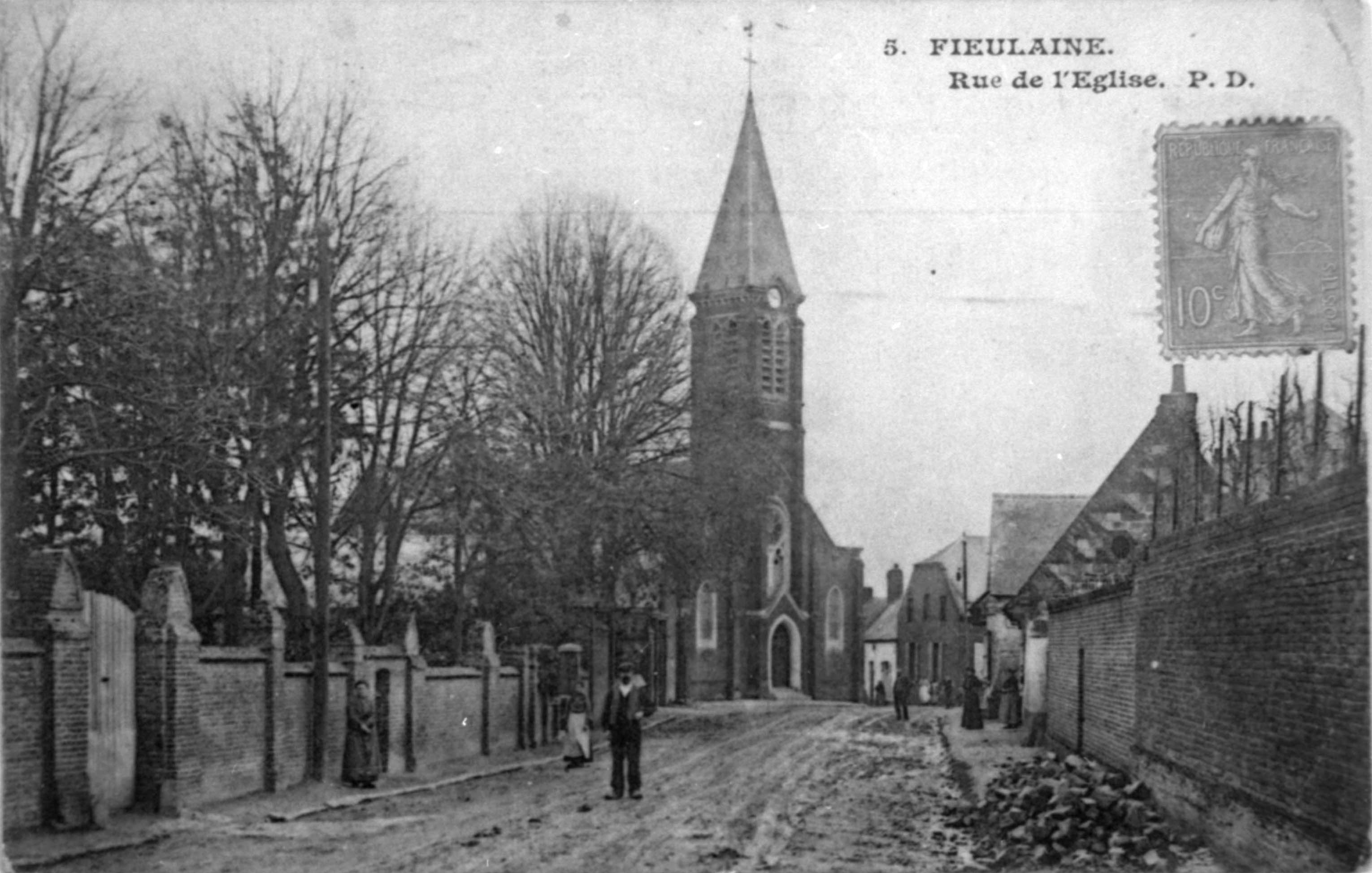
- The church of Fieulaine in the early 20th century
- Location of Fieulaine
- Location within France Location within Hauts-de-France
- Coordinates: 49°54′00″N 3°26′58″E
- Country: France
- Region: Hauts-de-France
- Department: Aisne
- Arrondissement: Saint-Quentin
- Canton: Saint-Quentin-2
- Intercommunality: CA Saint-Quentinois

Government
  - Mayor (2026–32): Jérôme Leclercq
- Area^{1}: 7.74 km^{2} (2.99 sq mi)
- Elevation: 150 m (490 ft)
- Highest elevation: 146 m (479 ft)
- Lowest elevation: 83 m (272 ft)
- Population (2023): 249
  - Density: 32.2/km^{2} (83.3/sq mi)
- Time zone: UTC+01:00 (CET)
  - Summer (DST): UTC+02:00 (CEST)
- INSEE/Postal code: 02310 /02110
- ^{1} French Land Register data, which excludes lakes, ponds, glaciers > 1 km^{2} (0.386 sq mi or 247 acres) and river estuaries.

Fieulaine (French pronunciation: [fjœlɛn]) is a commune in the Aisne department in Hauts-de-France in northern France.

== Population ==
Historical population
Year	Pop.	±% p.a.
1968	288	—
1975	277	−0.55%
1982	287	+0.51%
1990	255	−1.47%
1999	253	−0.09%
2007	274	+1.00%
2012	276	+0.15%
2017	256	−1.49%
2023	249	−0.46%
Source: INSEE

== See also ==
- Communes of the Aisne department
