= Harly =

- Commune
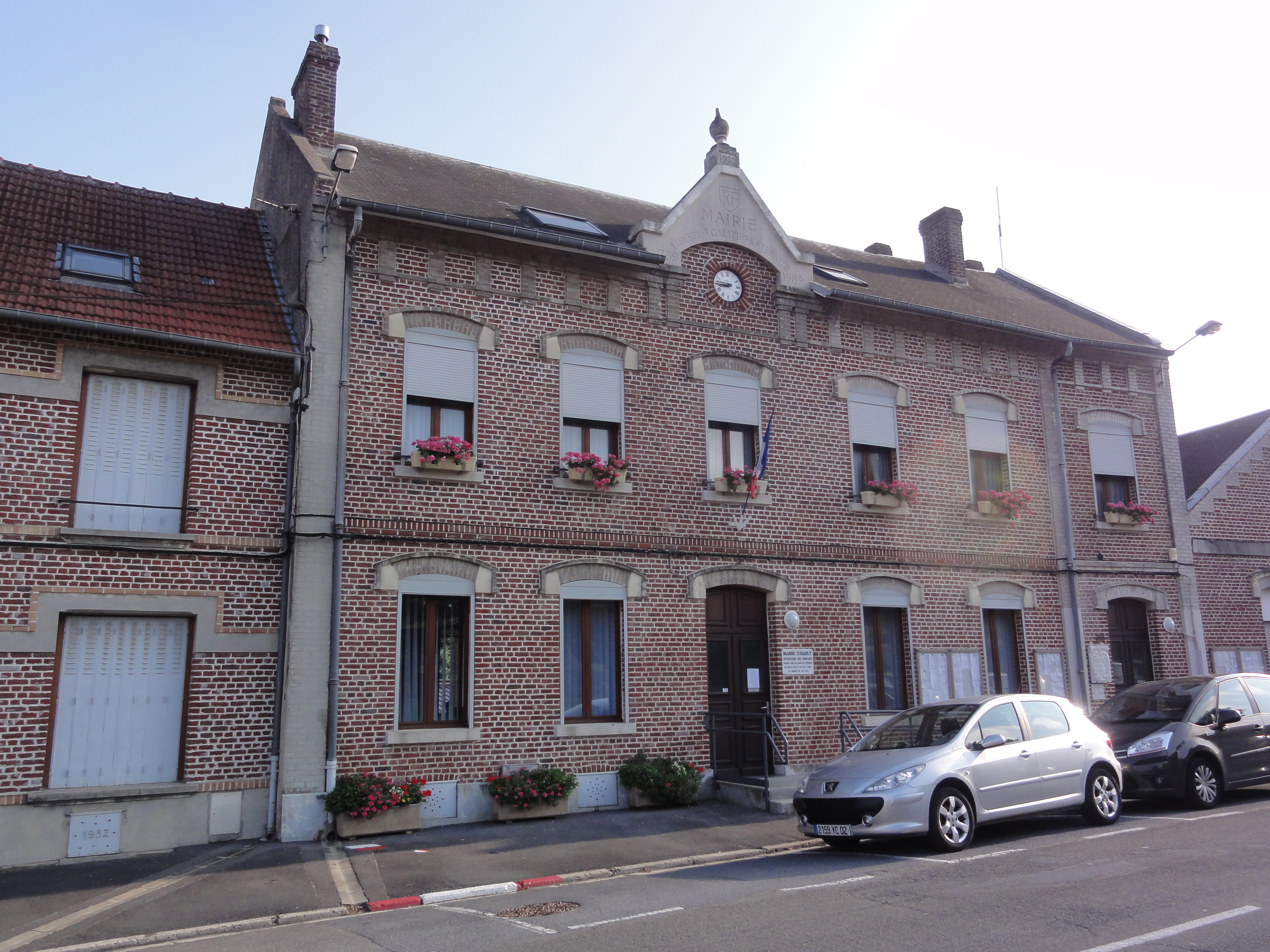
- The town hall of Harly
- Location of Harly
- Location within France Location within Hauts-de-France
- Coordinates: 49°50′35″N 3°19′19″E
- Country: France
- Region: Hauts-de-France
- Department: Aisne
- Arrondissement: Saint-Quentin
- Canton: Saint-Quentin-3
- Intercommunality: CA Saint-Quentinois

Government
  - Mayor (2026–32): Michel Magniez
- Area^{1}: 3.76 km^{2} (1.45 sq mi)
- Elevation: 100 m (330 ft)
- Highest elevation: 112 m (367 ft)
- Lowest elevation: 72 m (236 ft)
- Population (2023): 1,569
  - Density: 417/km^{2} (1,080/sq mi)
- Time zone: UTC+01:00 (CET)
  - Summer (DST): UTC+02:00 (CEST)
- INSEE/Postal code: 02371 /02100
- ^{1} French Land Register data, which excludes lakes, ponds, glaciers > 1 km^{2} (0.386 sq mi or 247 acres) and river estuaries.

Harly (French pronunciation: [aʁli]) is a commune in the Aisne department in Hauts-de-France in northern France.

== Geography ==
The commune is located in the valley of the Homblières, it is bathed by the Somme and its marshes and Streaming of Harly.

== History ==
- Latin name: Harcliacum
- Carved flints were found in the town.
- Village of former Vermandois, the stewardship of Amiens, bailages and election of Saint-Quentin, Diocese of Noyon.

By the end of the tenth century, 943, mention is made of super Harli Harly Somenam fluvium in the relationship miracles relics of Saint Quentin.

In the 17th century, Harly, possession of the Chapter of St. Quentin at the outset, is Seigneurerie de l'Abbaye de Vermand.

The municipality had a bunker that belonged to the Hindenburg Line (WWI).

== Population ==
Historical population
| Year | Pop. | ±% p.a. |
|---|---|---|
| 1968 | 1,445 | — |
| 1975 | 1,425 | −0.20% |
| 1982 | 1,976 | +4.78% |
| 1990 | 1,892 | −0.54% |
| 1999 | 1,803 | −0.53% |
| 2007 | 1,761 | −0.29% |
| 2012 | 1,688 | −0.84% |
| 2017 | 1,610 | −0.94% |
| 2023 | 1,569 | −0.43% |
Source: INSEE

== Administration ==
List of successive mayors :

- René Lamy - Party : PS
- René Horb - Party : PS
- Bernard Destombes

== Places of interest ==
- Saint-Martin church, dated from the 17th century, destroyed during the First World War and rebuilt around 1926.
- Monument to deaths in the First and Second world wars.
- Calvary located on rue Quentin-de-la Tour.
- Daltroff factory and worker accommodation next to the factory, built in 1875.
- Château d'Harly (important bourgeois house), destroyed during the First World War.
- A Merovingian cemetery, containing around 700 graves.

== Notable people ==
Lords of the town (Source Genealogy Aisne)

- 1218 Adam Harly
- 1241-1248 Godard of Harly
- 14?? Jean de Fosseux
- 14?? Philippe de Fosseux, often used the last name Borgne
- 1734-1811 Joseph Dufermont, parish priest and member of the National Assembly.
- 192?-2019 André Triou, historian
- Jean-Marie Lefèvre (born 1953), modernist and minimalist poet

== See also ==
- Communes of the Aisne department
