= Paul Joseph Boudier =

French civil servant

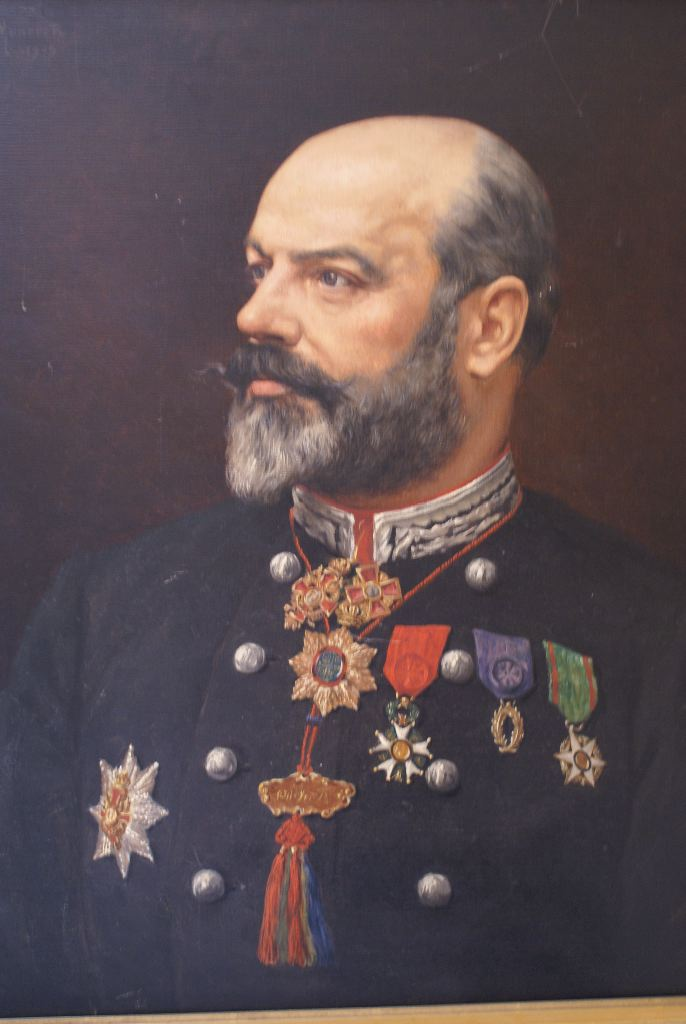
- Born: 27 December 1854; Corgoloin, Côte-d’Or, France (Second French Empire)
- Died: 8 November 1908 (aged 53); Corgoloin, Côte-d’Or, France (French Third Republic)
- Other names: Paul Boudier
- Occupation: French prefect

Paul Joseph Boudier (December 1854 – 8 November 1908) was a French civil servant.

== Career ==
- 1885 Sub-prefect of Saint-Quentin in Saint-Quentin City
- 1888-1893 Prefect of Yonne in Auxerre
- 1893-1896 Prefect of Haute-Marne in Chaumont
- 1896-1897 Prefect of Corsica in Ajaccio
- 1897-1898 Prefect of Saône-et-Loire in Mâcon
- 1898-1900 Prefect of Haute-Vienne in Limoges

== Honours and awards ==
- France: Officier of the Légion d’honneur

Political offices
Preceded by	Prefect of Yonne; 1888–1893	Succeeded by
Preceded by	Prefect of Haute-Marne; 1893–1896	Succeeded by
Preceded by	Prefect of Corsica; 1896–1897	Succeeded by
Preceded by	Prefect of Saône-et-Loire; 1897–1898	Succeeded by
Preceded by Raoul Couppel du Lude	Prefect of Haute-Vienne; 1898–1900	Succeeded by Edgar Monteil
