= Contescourt =

- Commune
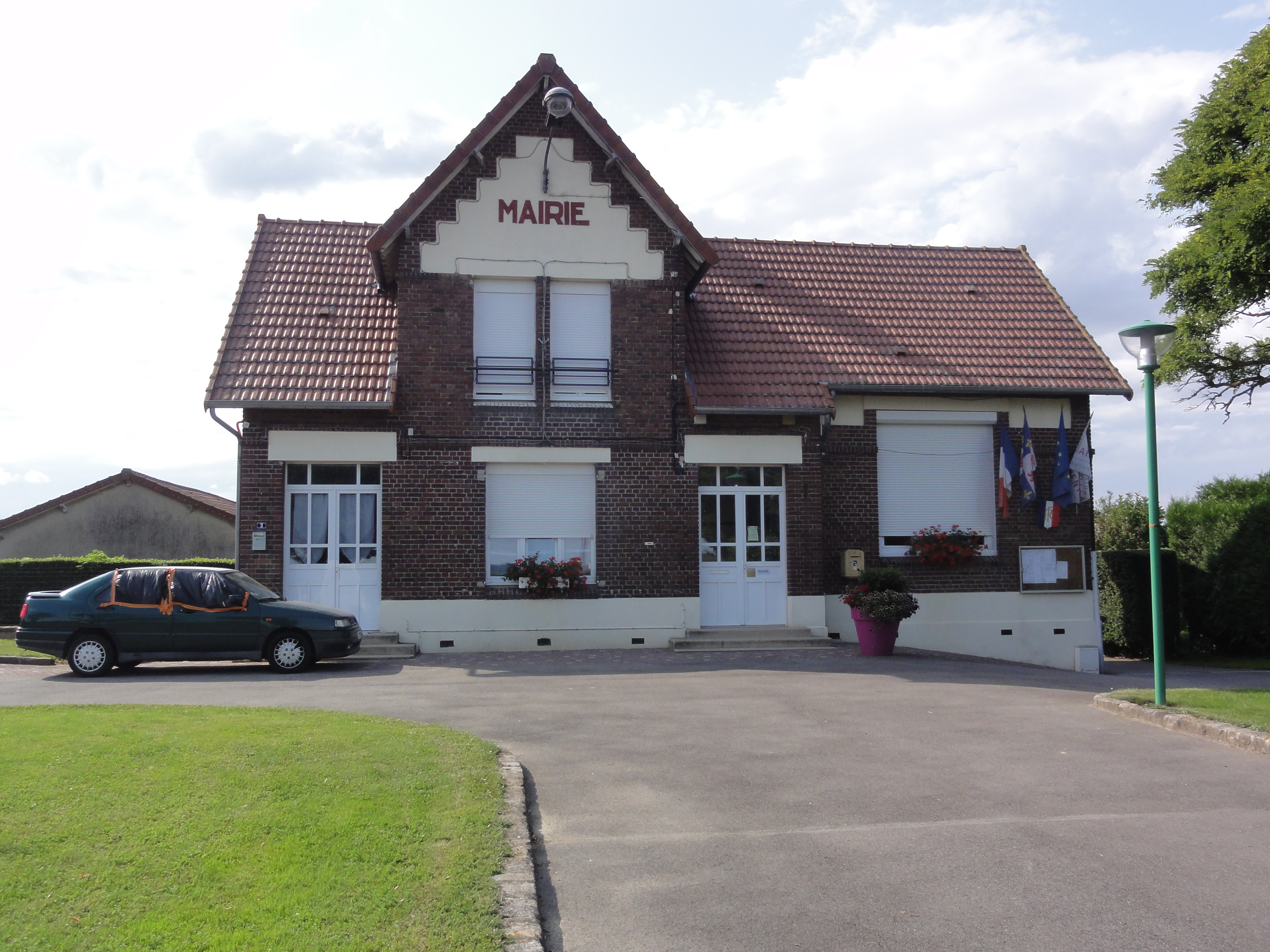
- The town hall of Contescourt
- Location of Contescourt
- Location within France Location within Hauts-de-France
- Coordinates: 49°47′36″N 3°13′54″E
- Country: France
- Region: Hauts-de-France
- Department: Aisne
- Arrondissement: Saint-Quentin
- Canton: Saint-Quentin-3
- Intercommunality: CA Saint-Quentinois

Government
  - Mayor (2026–32): Dimitri Deljehier
- Area^{1}: 3.42 km^{2} (1.32 sq mi)
- Elevation: 96 m (315 ft)
- Highest elevation: 101 m (331 ft)
- Lowest elevation: 67 m (220 ft)
- Population (2023): 61
  - Density: 18/km^{2} (46/sq mi)
- Time zone: UTC+01:00 (CET)
  - Summer (DST): UTC+02:00 (CEST)
- INSEE/Postal code: 02214 /02680
- ^{1} French Land Register data, which excludes lakes, ponds, glaciers > 1 km^{2} (0.386 sq mi or 247 acres) and river estuaries.

Contescourt is a commune in the Aisne department in Hauts-de-France in northern France.

== Population ==
Historical population
Year	Pop.	±% p.a.
1968	73	—
1975	70	−0.60%
1982	74	+0.80%
1990	79	+0.82%
1999	74	−0.72%
2007	72	−0.34%
2012	65	−2.02%
2017	61	−1.26%
2023	61	+0.00%
Source: INSEE

== See also ==
- Communes of the Aisne department
