= Dallon =

- Commune
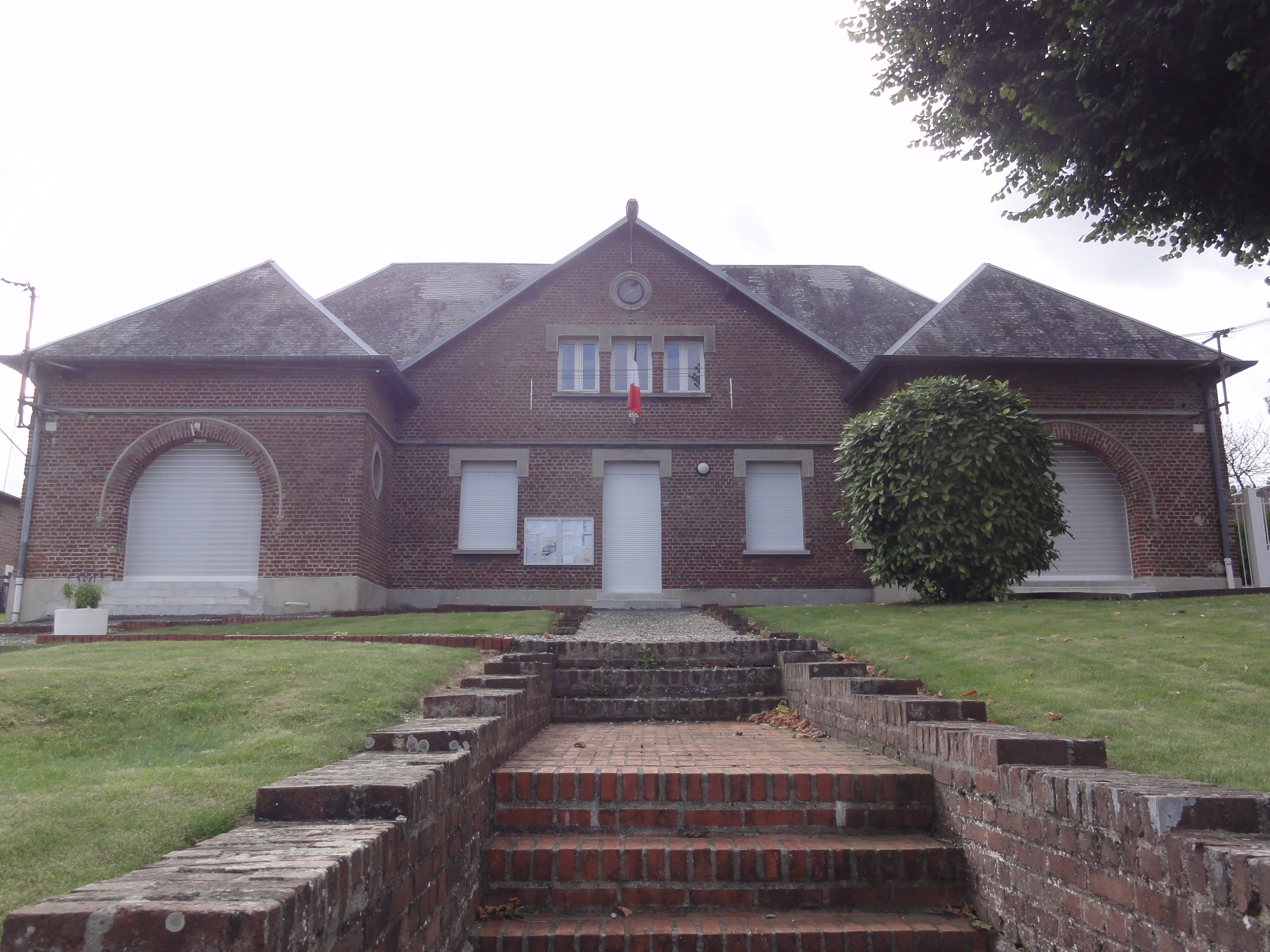
- The town hall of Dallon

- Coat of arms
- Location of Dallon
- Location within France Location within Hauts-de-France
- Coordinates: 49°49′19″N 3°14′32″E
- Country: France
- Region: Hauts-de-France
- Department: Aisne
- Arrondissement: Saint-Quentin
- Canton: Ribemont
- Intercommunality: CA Saint-Quentinois

Government
  - Mayor (2026–32): Nicolas Pinchon
- Area^{1}: 5.81 km^{2} (2.24 sq mi)
- Elevation: 106 m (348 ft)
- Highest elevation: 121 m (397 ft)
- Lowest elevation: 67 m (220 ft)
- Population (2023): 424
  - Density: 73.0/km^{2} (189/sq mi)
- Time zone: UTC+01:00 (CET)
  - Summer (DST): UTC+02:00 (CEST)
- INSEE/Postal code: 02257 /02680
- ^{1} French Land Register data, which excludes lakes, ponds, glaciers > 1 km^{2} (0.386 sq mi or 247 acres) and river estuaries.

Dallon (French pronunciation: [dalɔ̃]) is a commune in the Aisne department in Hauts-de-France in northern France.

It is located on the banks of the Somme and its marshes, and the canal Saint-Quentin. Its former name is Dalonaie, on record in the year 1035.

== Population ==
Historical population
| Year | Pop. | ±% p.a. |
|---|---|---|
| 1968 | 300 | — |
| 1975 | 363 | +2.76% |
| 1982 | 369 | +0.23% |
| 1990 | 395 | +0.85% |
| 1999 | 403 | +0.22% |
| 2007 | 379 | −0.76% |
| 2012 | 407 | +1.44% |
| 2017 | 436 | +1.39% |
| 2023 | 424 | −0.46% |
Source: INSEE

== Sights ==
- Eglise Saint Medard
- Calvary

== See also ==
- Communes of the Aisne department
