= Happencourt =

- Commune
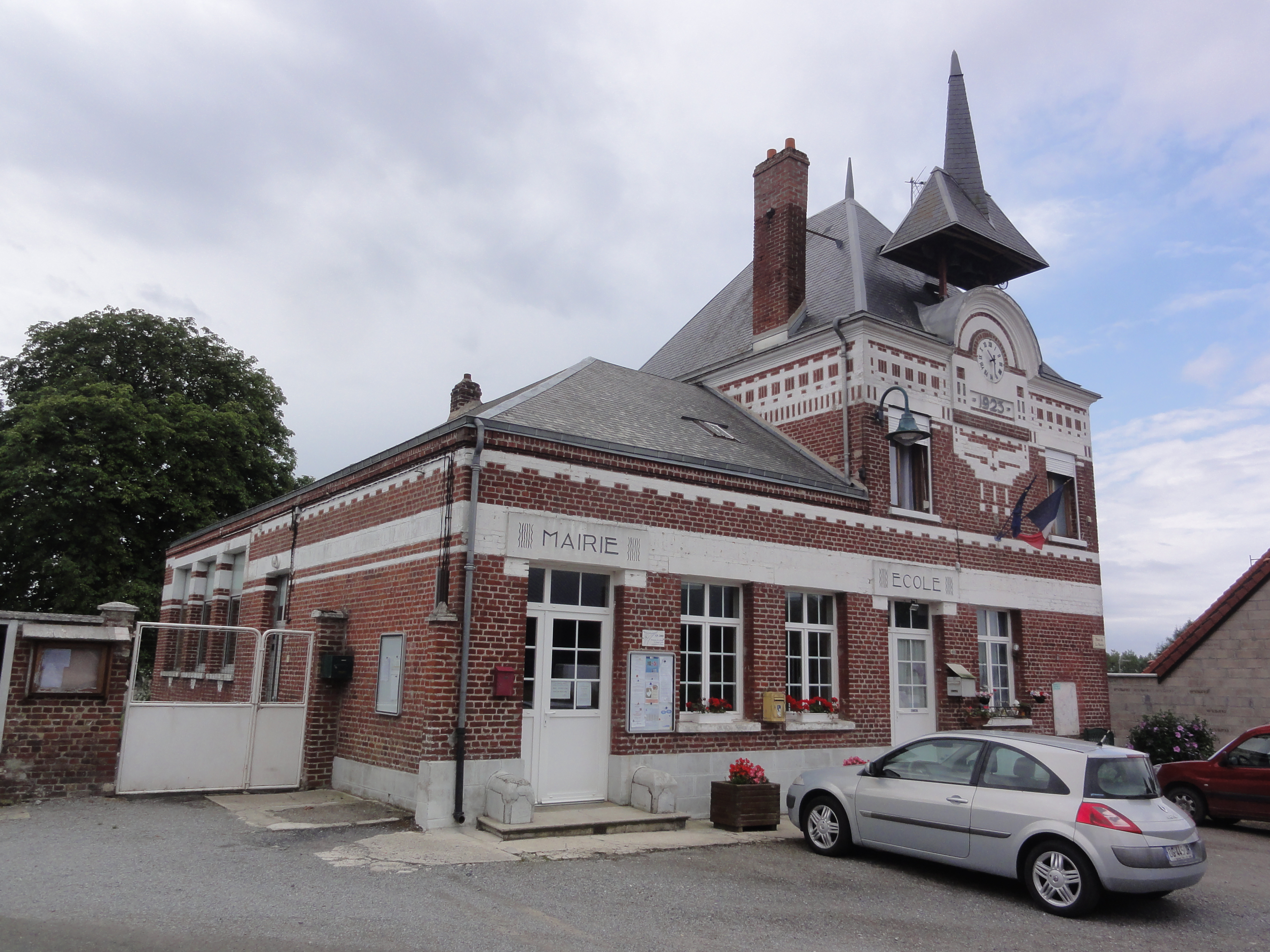
- The town hall of Happencourt
- Location of Happencourt
- Location within France Location within Hauts-de-France
- Coordinates: 49°46′43″N 3°11′17″E
- Country: France
- Region: Hauts-de-France
- Department: Aisne
- Arrondissement: Saint-Quentin
- Canton: Ribemont
- Intercommunality: CA Saint-Quentinois

Government
  - Mayor (2026–32): Damien Nicolas
- Area^{1}: 5.18 km^{2} (2.00 sq mi)
- Elevation: 89 m (292 ft)
- Highest elevation: 101 m (331 ft)
- Lowest elevation: 63 m (207 ft)
- Population (2023): 179
  - Density: 34.6/km^{2} (89.5/sq mi)
- Time zone: UTC+01:00 (CET)
  - Summer (DST): UTC+02:00 (CEST)
- INSEE/Postal code: 02367 /02480
- ^{1} French Land Register data, which excludes lakes, ponds, glaciers > 1 km^{2} (0.386 sq mi or 247 acres) and river estuaries.

Happencourt (French pronunciation: [apɑ̃kuʁ]) is a commune in the Aisne department in Hauts-de-France in northern France.

== Population ==
Historical population
Year	Pop.	±% p.a.
1968	201	—
1975	183	−1.33%
1982	143	−3.46%
1990	167	+1.96%
1999	162	−0.34%
2007	159	−0.23%
2012	145	−1.83%
2017	133	−1.71%
2023	179	+5.08%
Source: INSEE

== See also ==
- Communes of the Aisne department
