= Ollezy =

- Commune
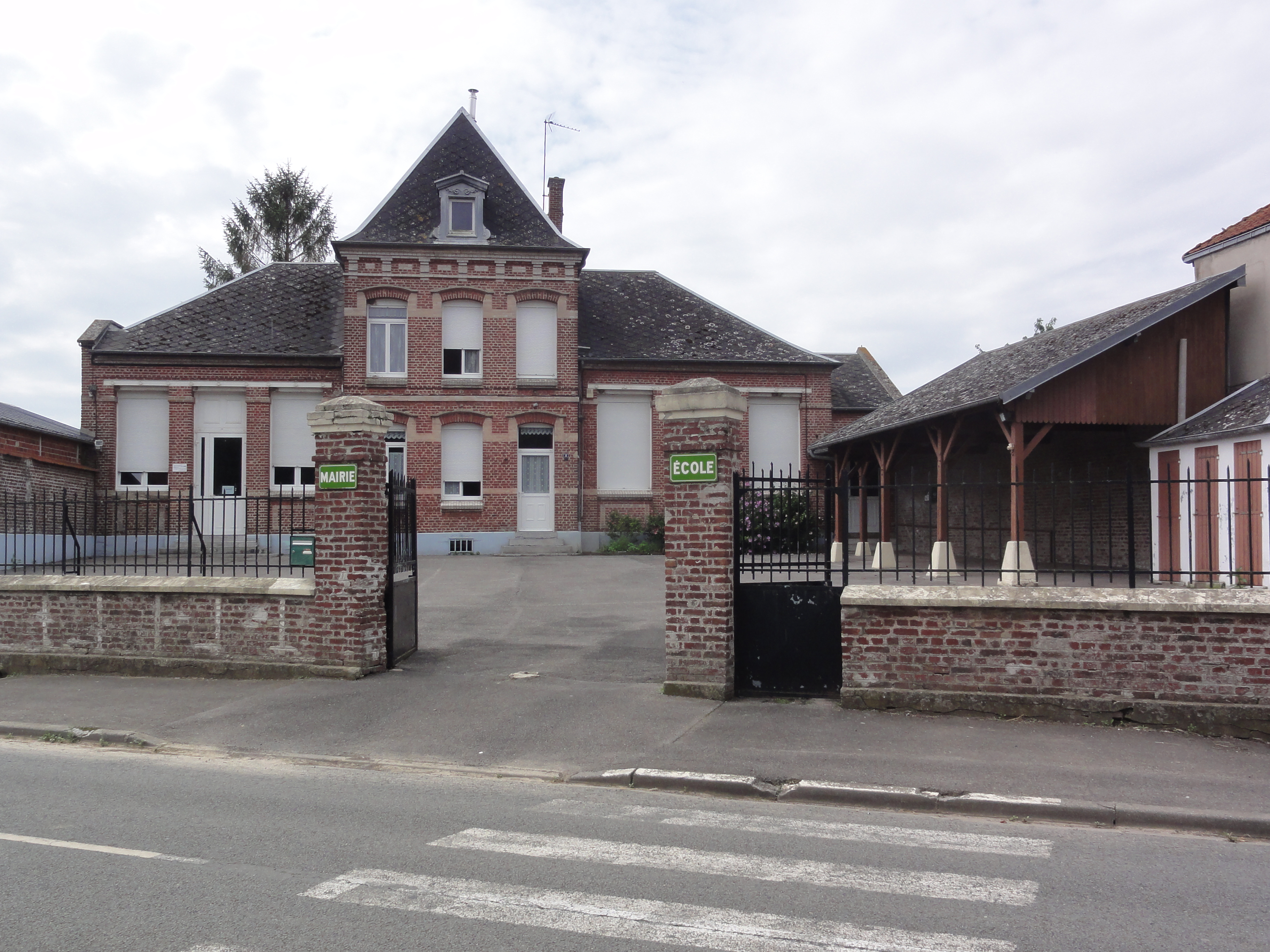
- The town hall and school of Ollezy
- Location of Ollezy
- Location within France Location within Hauts-de-France
- Coordinates: 49°44′03″N 3°08′44″E
- Country: France
- Region: Hauts-de-France
- Department: Aisne
- Arrondissement: Saint-Quentin
- Canton: Ribemont
- Intercommunality: CA Saint-Quentinois

Government
  - Mayor (2026–32): Sébastien Van Hyfte
- Area^{1}: 5.31 km^{2} (2.05 sq mi)
- Elevation: 68 m (223 ft)
- Highest elevation: 77 m (253 ft)
- Lowest elevation: 63 m (207 ft)
- Population (2023): 169
  - Density: 31.8/km^{2} (82.4/sq mi)
- Time zone: UTC+01:00 (CET)
  - Summer (DST): UTC+02:00 (CEST)
- INSEE/Postal code: 02570 /02480
- ^{1} French Land Register data, which excludes lakes, ponds, glaciers > 1 km^{2} (0.386 sq mi or 247 acres) and river estuaries.

Ollezy (French pronunciation: [ɔlzi]) is a commune in the Aisne department in Hauts-de-France in northern France.

== Population ==
Historical population
Year	Pop.	±% p.a.
1968	162	—
1975	161	−0.09%
1982	163	+0.18%
1990	151	−0.95%
1999	158	+0.50%
2007	145	−1.07%
2012	171	+3.35%
2017	184	+1.48%
2023	169	−1.41%
Source: INSEE

== Climate ==
In 2010, the climate of the commune was of the degraded oceanic climate type of the central and northern plains, according to a CNRS study based on a series of data covering the period 1971-20001. In 2020, Météo-France published a typology of the climates of metropolitan France in which the municipality is exposed to an oceanic climate and is in the northeast climatic region of the Paris basin, characterized by mediocre sunshine, average rainfall regularly distributed across the during the year and a cold winter (3 °C)2.

For the period 1971-2000, the average annual temperature is 10.4 °C, with an annual thermal range of 15 °C. The average annual cumulative precipitation is 684 mm, with 10.7 days of precipitation in January and 8.6 days in July1. For the period 1991-2020, the average annual temperature observed at the nearest meteorological station, located in the commune of Fontaine-lès-Clercs, 10 km as the crow flies3, is 10.8 °C and the annual cumulative average precipitation is 683.4 mm4.5. For the future, the municipality's climate parameters estimated for 2050 according to different greenhouse gas emission scenarios can be consulted on a dedicated site published by Météo-France in November 2022.

== See also ==
- Communes of the Aisne department
