= Dury, Aisne =

Dury
- Commune
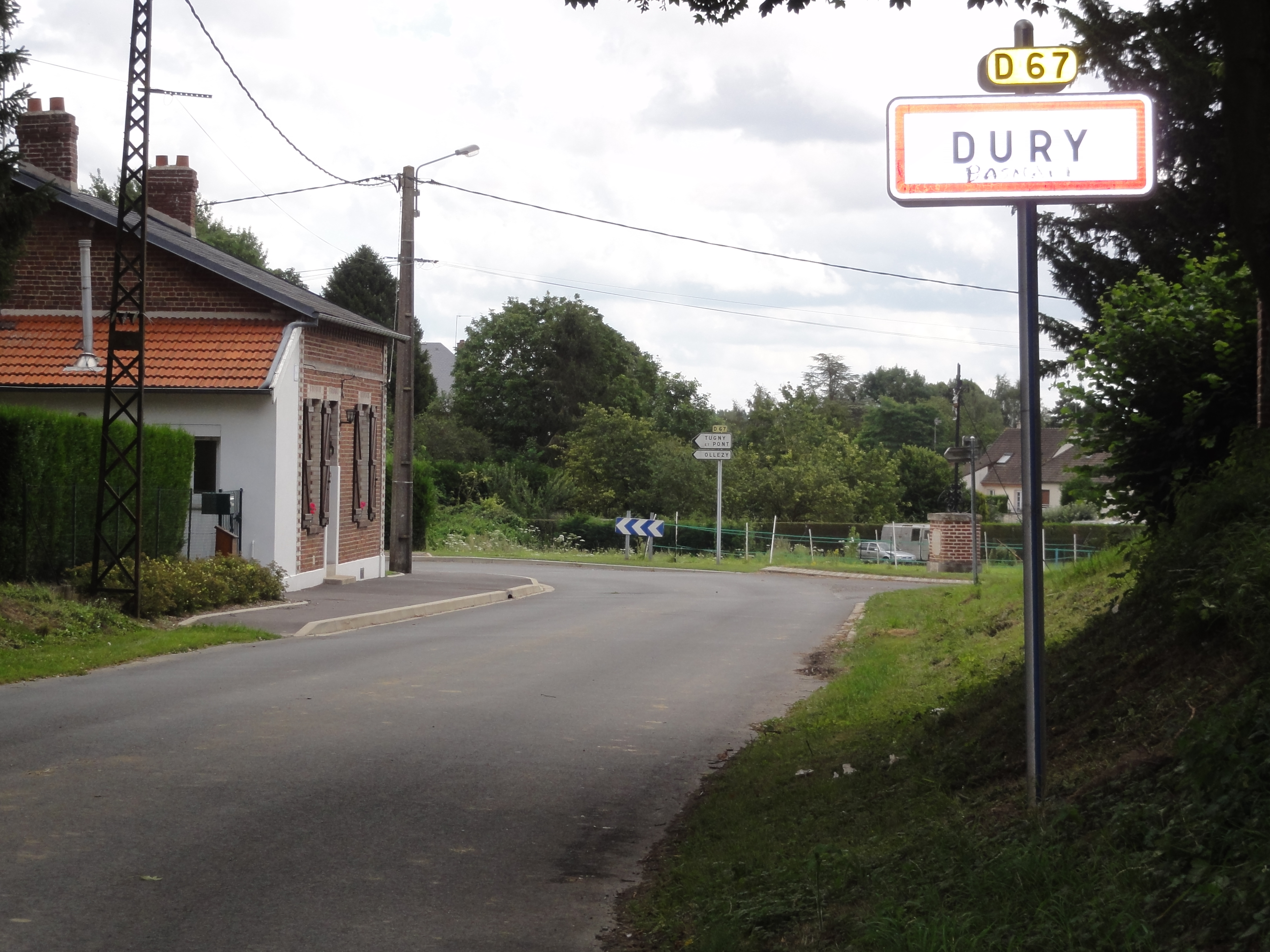
- The road into Dury

- Coat of arms
- Location of Dury
- Location within France Location within Hauts-de-France
- Coordinates: 49°45′05″N 3°07′47″E
- Country: France
- Region: Hauts-de-France
- Department: Aisne
- Arrondissement: Saint-Quentin
- Canton: Ribemont
- Intercommunality: CA Saint-Quentinois

Government
  - Mayor (2026–32): Alain Rachesbœuf
- Area^{1}: 7.74 km^{2} (2.99 sq mi)
- Elevation: 72 m (236 ft)
- Highest elevation: 87 m (285 ft)
- Lowest elevation: 62 m (203 ft)
- Population (2023): 191
  - Density: 24.7/km^{2} (63.9/sq mi)
- Time zone: UTC+01:00 (CET)
  - Summer (DST): UTC+02:00 (CEST)
- INSEE/Postal code: 02273 /02480
- ^{1} French Land Register data, which excludes lakes, ponds, glaciers > 1 km^{2} (0.386 sq mi or 247 acres) and river estuaries.

Dury (French pronunciation: [dyʁi]) is a commune in the Aisne department in Hauts-de-France in northern France.

== Population ==
Historical population
Year	Pop.	±% p.a.
1968	219	—
1975	192	−1.86%
1982	203	+0.80%
1990	181	−1.42%
1999	177	−0.25%
2007	184	+0.49%
2012	200	+1.68%
2017	222	+2.11%
2023	191	−2.48%
Source: INSEE

== See also ==
- Communes of the Aisne department
