= Fontaine-lès-Clercs =

- Commune
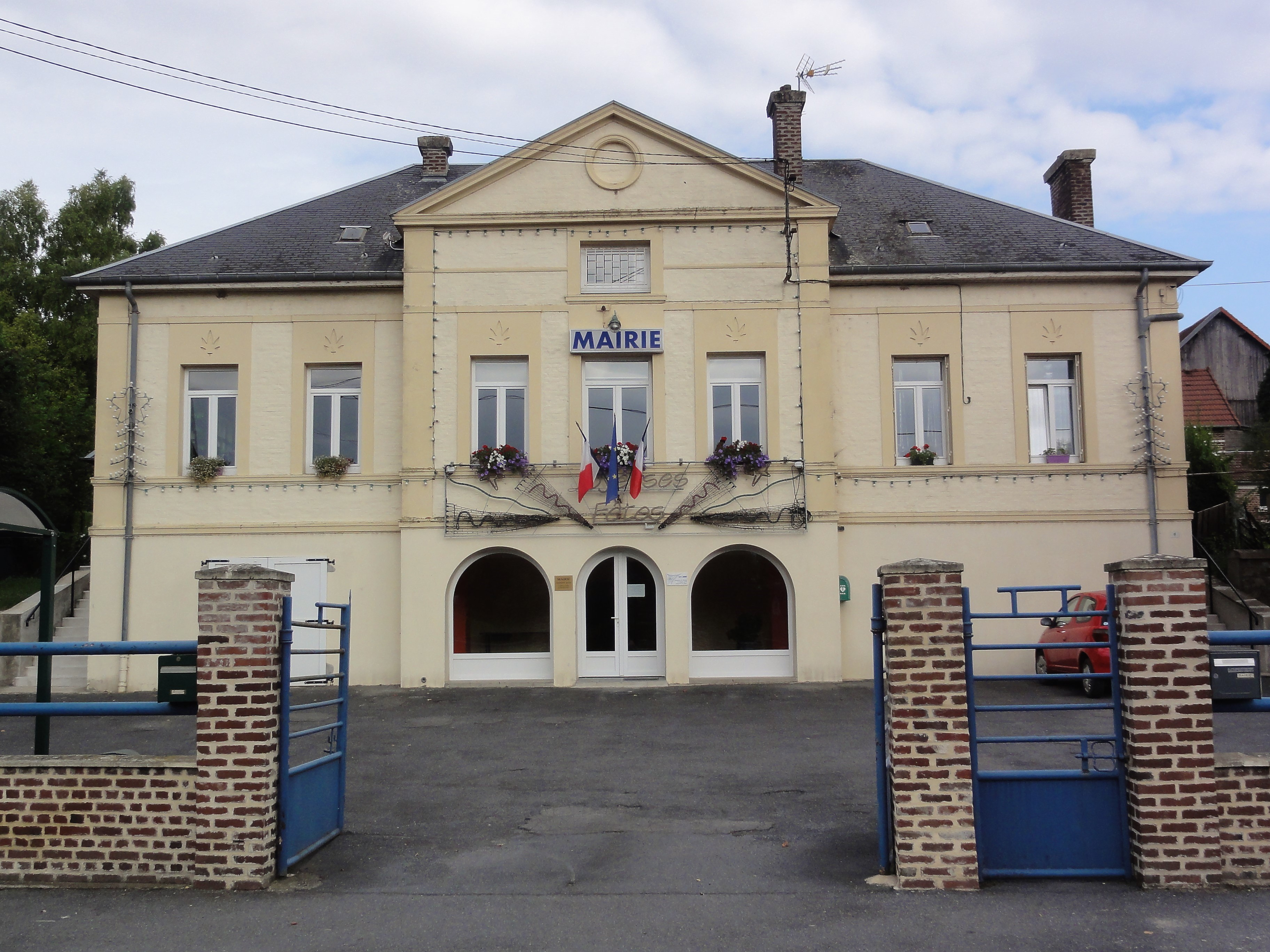
- The town hall of Fontaines-lès-Clercs
- Location of Fontaine-lès-Clercs
- Location within France Location within Hauts-de-France
- Coordinates: 49°48′23″N 3°13′25″E
- Country: France
- Region: Hauts-de-France
- Department: Aisne
- Arrondissement: Saint-Quentin
- Canton: Ribemont
- Intercommunality: CA Saint-Quentinois

Government
  - Mayor (2026–32): Frédéric Maudens
- Area^{1}: 5.33 km^{2} (2.06 sq mi)
- Elevation: 84 m (276 ft)
- Highest elevation: 102 m (335 ft)
- Lowest elevation: 67 m (220 ft)
- Population (2023): 232
  - Density: 43.5/km^{2} (113/sq mi)
- Time zone: UTC+01:00 (CET)
  - Summer (DST): UTC+02:00 (CEST)
- INSEE/Postal code: 02320 /02680
- ^{1} French Land Register data, which excludes lakes, ponds, glaciers > 1 km^{2} (0.386 sq mi or 247 acres) and river estuaries.

Fontaine-lès-Clercs is a commune in the Aisne department in Hauts-de-France in northern France.

== Population ==
Historical population
Year	Pop.	±% p.a.
1968	244	—
1975	245	+0.06%
1982	224	−1.27%
1990	260	+1.88%
1999	274	+0.58%
2007	289	+0.67%
2012	280	−0.63%
2017	250	−2.24%
2023	232	−1.24%
Source: INSEE

== See also ==
- Communes of the Aisne department
