= Canton of Saint-Quentin-Centre =

Coordinates: 49.8500°N 3.2833°E

Saint-Quentin-Centre
- Former canton
- Interactive map of Saint-Quentin-Centre
- Country: France
- Region: Hauts-de-France
- Department: Aisne
- No. of communes: {{{nbcomm}}}
- Disbanded: 2015
- Population (2012): 19,418

The canton of Saint-Quentin-Centre is a former administrative division in northern France. It was disbanded following the French canton reorganisation which came into effect in March 2015. It had 19,418 inhabitants (2012). The canton comprised part of the commune of Saint-Quentin.

== Demographics ==
Historical population
| Year | Pop. | ±% |
|---|---|---|
| 1990 | 21,538 | — |
| 1999 | 20,189 | −6.3% |
| 2012 | 19,418 | −3.8% |

== See also ==
- Cantons of the Aisne department
