= Cugny =

- Commune
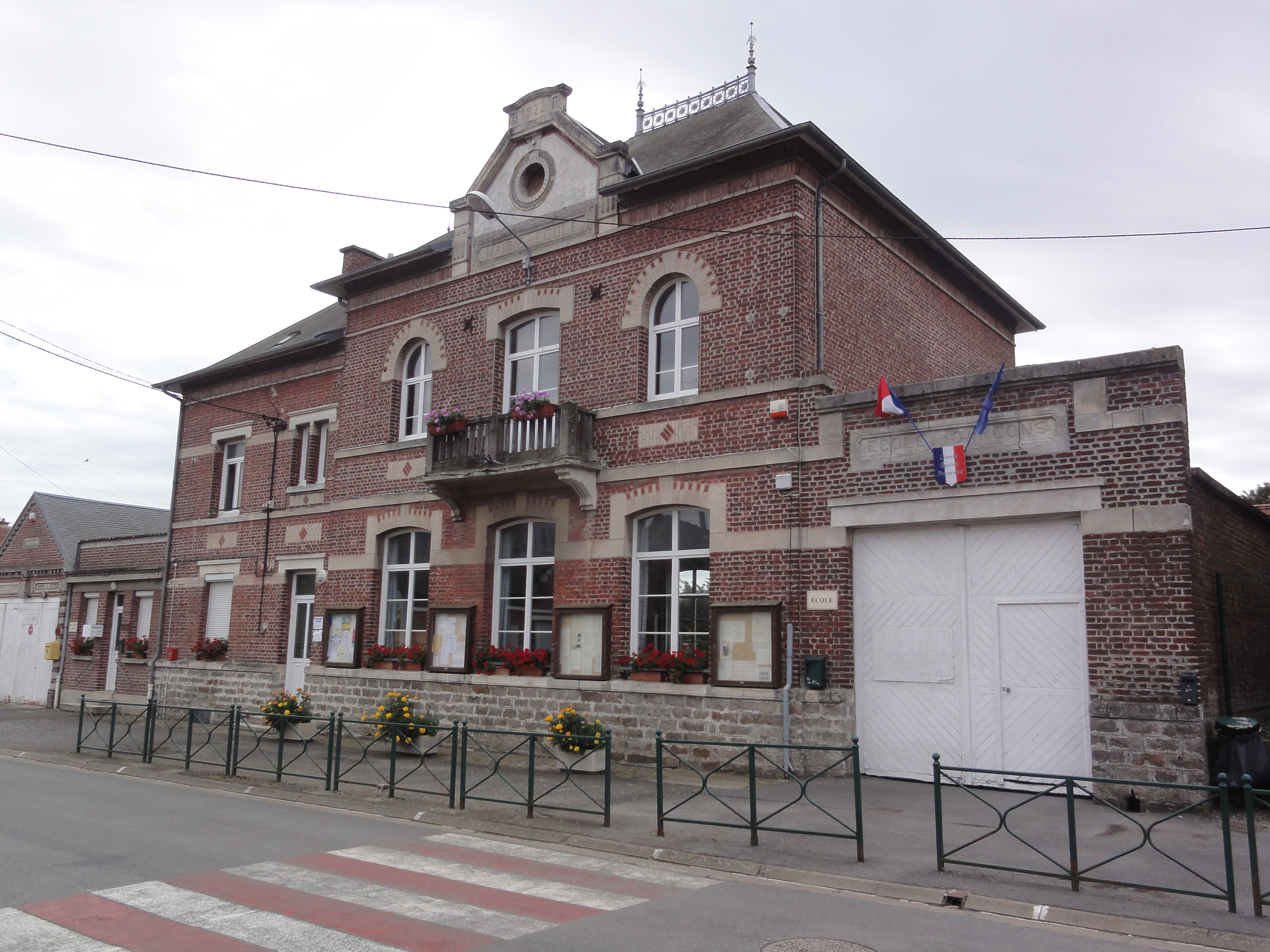
- The town hall and school of Cugny

- Coat of arms
- Location of Cugny
- Location within France Location within Hauts-de-France
- Coordinates: 49°42′29″N 3°09′15″E
- Country: France
- Region: Hauts-de-France
- Department: Aisne
- Arrondissement: Saint-Quentin
- Canton: Ribemont
- Intercommunality: CA Saint-Quentinois

Government
  - Mayor (2026–32): Michel Bono
- Area^{1}: 9.4 km^{2} (3.6 sq mi)
- Elevation: 70 m (230 ft)
- Highest elevation: 138 m (453 ft)
- Lowest elevation: 63 m (207 ft)
- Population (2023): 607
  - Density: 65/km^{2} (170/sq mi)
- Time zone: UTC+01:00 (CET)
  - Summer (DST): UTC+02:00 (CEST)
- INSEE/Postal code: 02246 /02480
- ^{1} French Land Register data, which excludes lakes, ponds, glaciers > 1 km^{2} (0.386 sq mi or 247 acres) and river estuaries.

Cugny (French pronunciation: [kyɲi]) is a commune in the Aisne department in Hauts-de-France in northern France.

== Points of interest ==
- Saint-Médard Church
- British military cemetery

== Population ==
Historical population
Year	Pop.	±% p.a.
1968	434	—
1975	387	−1.62%
1982	407	+0.72%
1990	501	+2.63%
1999	503	+0.04%
2007	552	+1.17%
2012	588	+1.27%
2017	606	+0.60%
2023	607	+0.03%
Source: INSEE

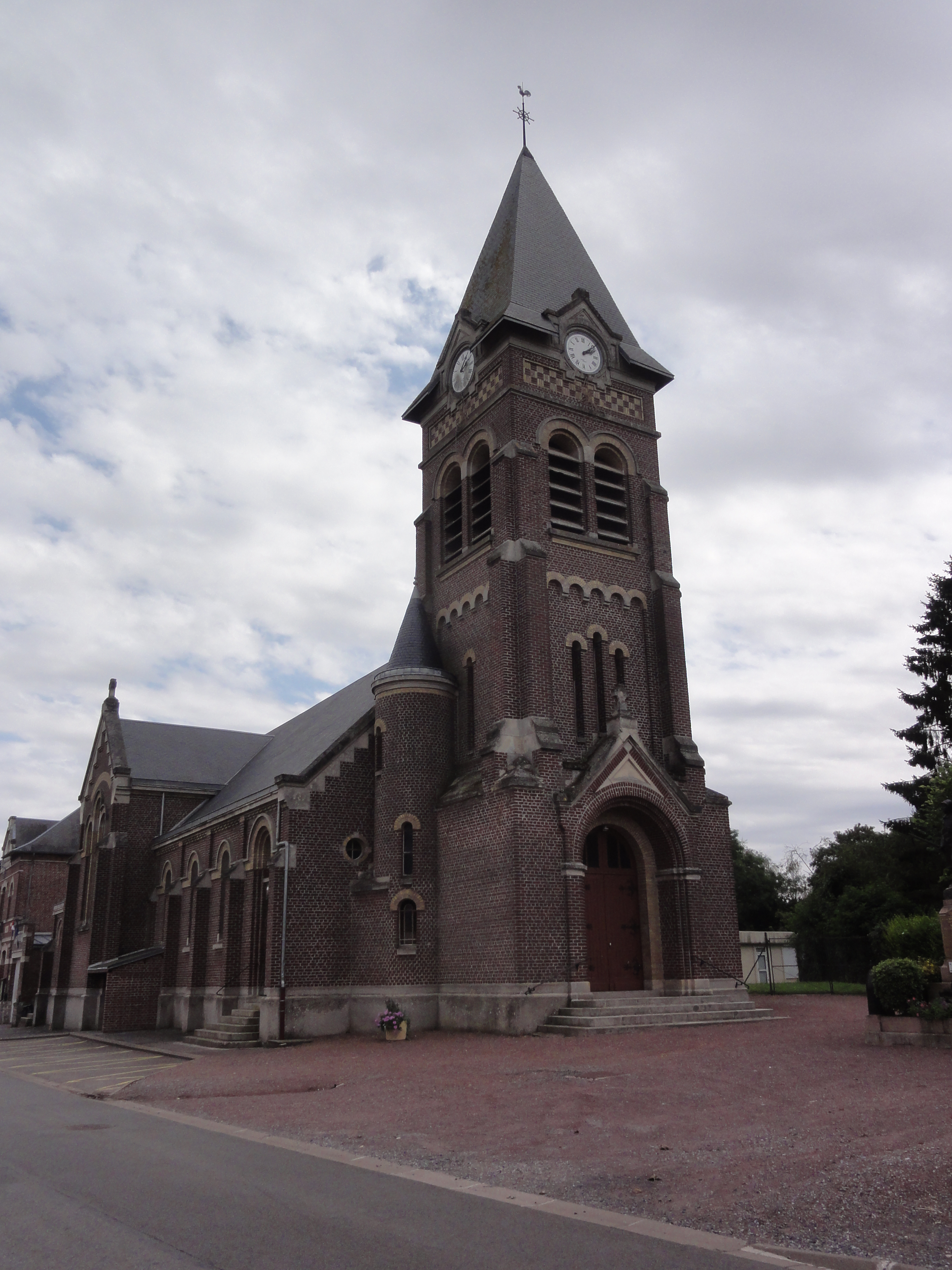
Saint-Médard Church

== See also ==
- Communes of the Aisne department
