= Sommette-Eaucourt =

- Commune
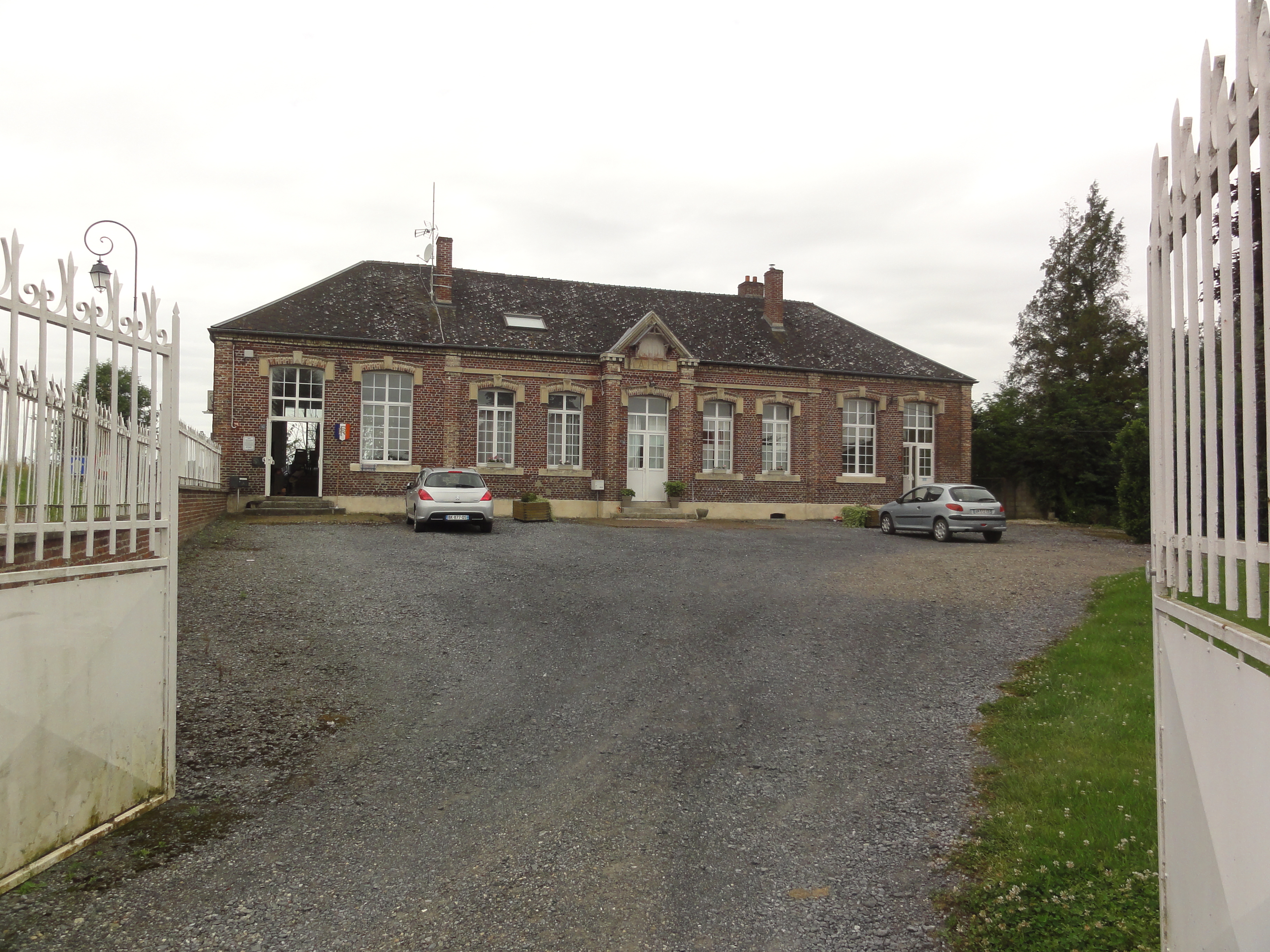
- The town hall of Sommette-Eaucourt
- Location of Sommette-Eaucourt
- Location within France Location within Hauts-de-France
- Coordinates: 49°44′26″N 3°07′05″E
- Country: France
- Region: Hauts-de-France
- Department: Aisne
- Arrondissement: Saint-Quentin
- Canton: Ribemont
- Intercommunality: CA Saint-Quentinois

Government
  - Mayor (2026–32): Paul Prevost
- Area^{1}: 6.28 km^{2} (2.42 sq mi)
- Elevation: 68 m (223 ft)
- Highest elevation: 76 m (249 ft)
- Lowest elevation: 61 m (200 ft)
- Population (2023): 178
  - Density: 28.3/km^{2} (73.4/sq mi)
- Time zone: UTC+01:00 (CET)
  - Summer (DST): UTC+02:00 (CEST)
- INSEE/Postal code: 02726 /02480
- ^{1} French Land Register data, which excludes lakes, ponds, glaciers > 1 km^{2} (0.386 sq mi or 247 acres) and river estuaries.

Sommette-Eaucourt (French pronunciation: [sɔmɛt okuʁ]) is a commune in the Aisne department in Hauts-de-France in northern France.

== Population ==
Historical population
Year	Pop.	±% p.a.
1968	172	—
1975	173	+0.08%
1982	139	−3.08%
1990	150	+0.96%
1999	157	+0.51%
2007	135	−1.87%
2012	156	+2.93%
2017	193	+4.35%
2023	178	−1.34%
Source: INSEE

== See also ==
- Communes of the Aisne department
