= Villers-Saint-Christophe =

- Commune
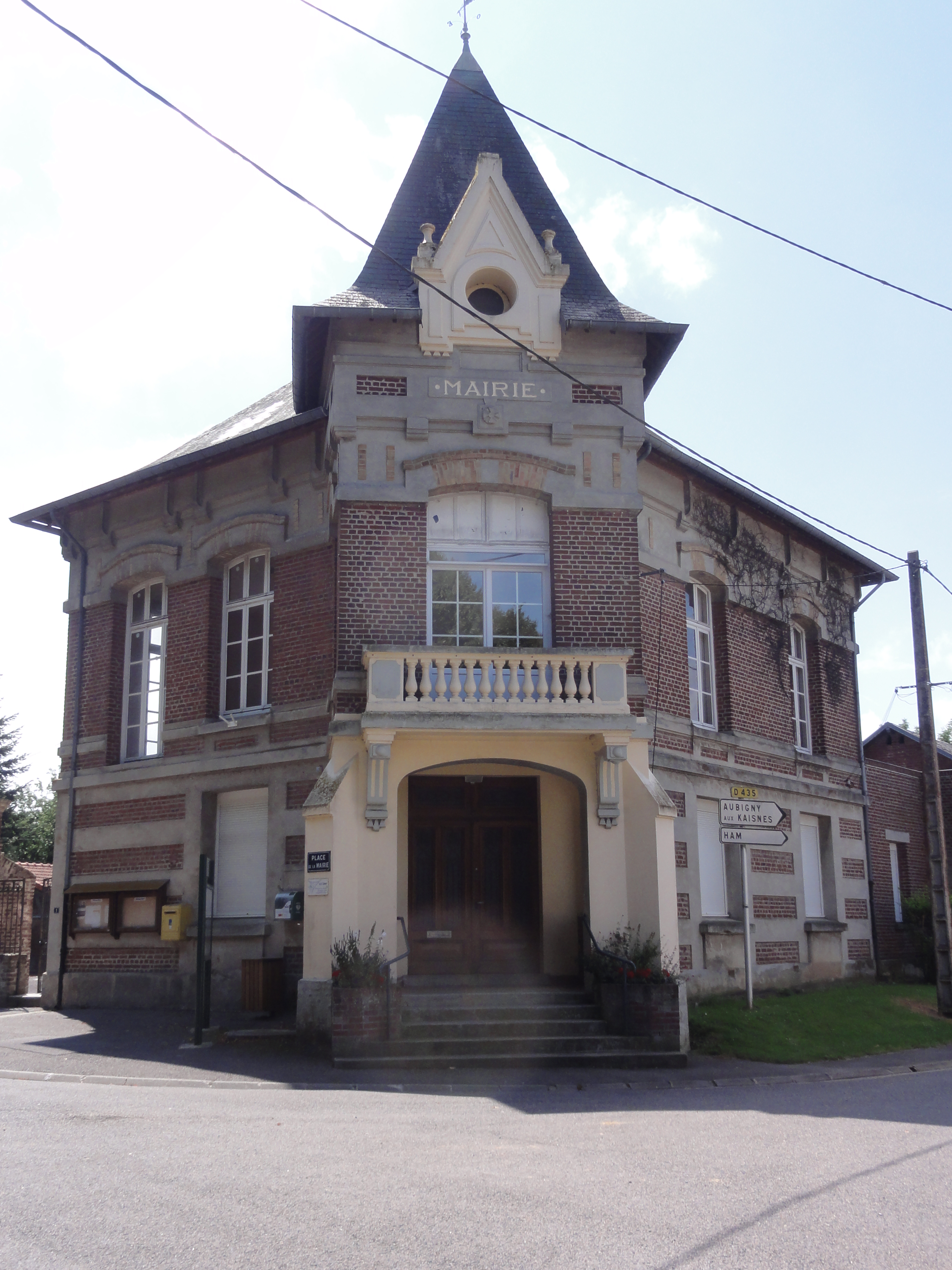
- The town hall of Villers-Saint-Christophe

- Coat of arms
- Location of Villers-Saint-Christophe
- Location within France Location within Hauts-de-France
- Coordinates: 49°46′49″N 3°05′38″E
- Country: France
- Region: Hauts-de-France
- Department: Aisne
- Arrondissement: Saint-Quentin
- Canton: Ribemont
- Intercommunality: CA Saint-Quentinois

Government
  - Mayor (2026–32): Florence Geneste
- Area^{1}: 8.99 km^{2} (3.47 sq mi)
- Elevation: 86 m (282 ft)
- Highest elevation: 96 m (315 ft)
- Lowest elevation: 65 m (213 ft)
- Population (2023): 418
  - Density: 46.5/km^{2} (120/sq mi)
- Time zone: UTC+01:00 (CET)
  - Summer (DST): UTC+02:00 (CEST)
- INSEE/Postal code: 02815 /02590
- ^{1} French Land Register data, which excludes lakes, ponds, glaciers > 1 km^{2} (0.386 sq mi or 247 acres) and river estuaries.

Villers-Saint-Christophe (French pronunciation: [vilɛʁ sɛ̃ kʁistɔf]) is a commune in the Aisne department in Hauts-de-France in northern France.

== Population ==
Historical population
Year	Pop.	±% p.a.
1968	398	—
1975	387	−0.40%
1982	437	+1.75%
1990	430	−0.20%
1999	437	+0.18%
2007	454	+0.48%
2012	470	+0.70%
2017	435	−1.54%
2023	418	−0.66%
Source: INSEE

== See also ==
- Communes of the Aisne department
