= Seraucourt-le-Grand =

- Commune
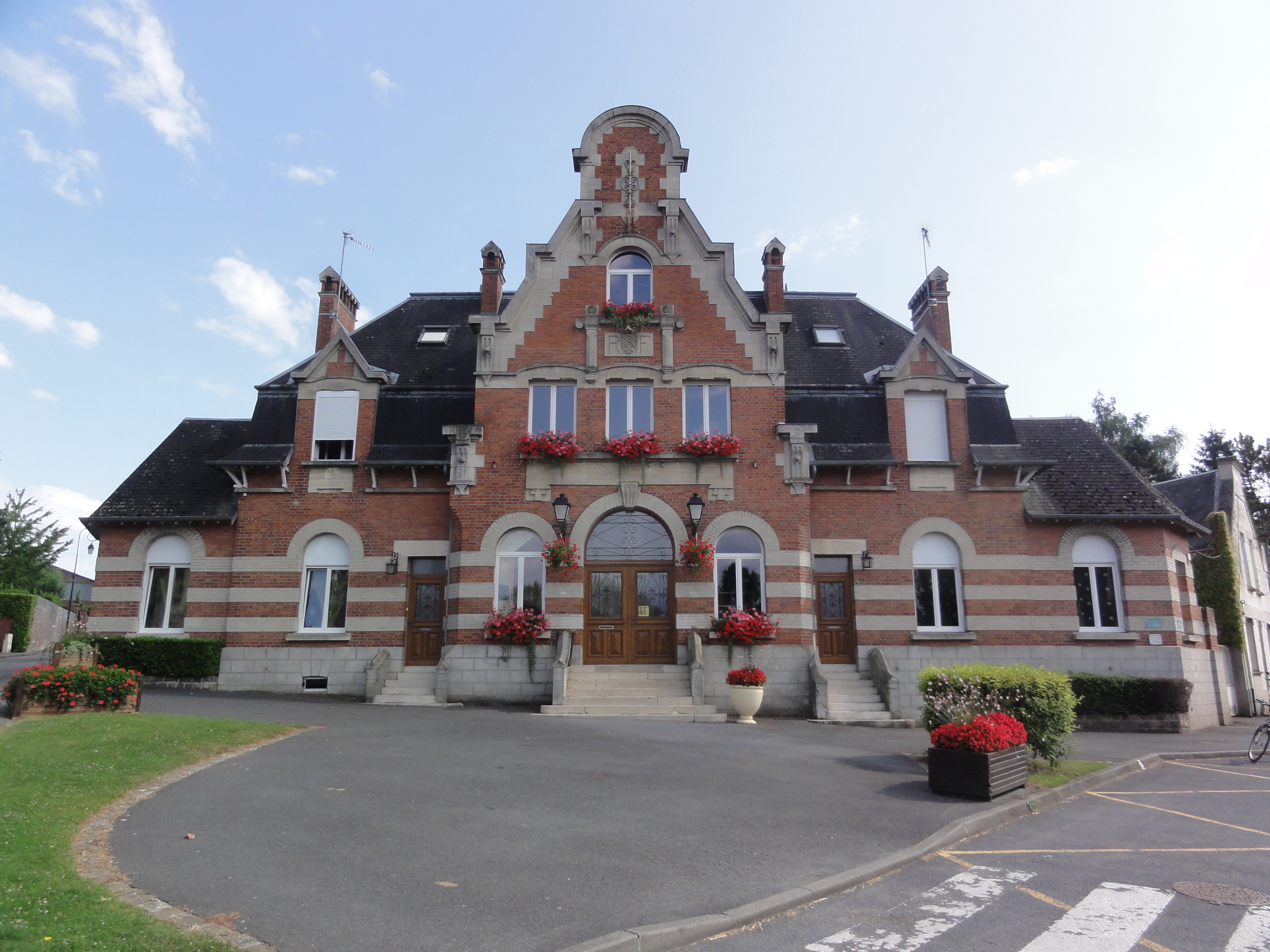
- The town hall of Seraucourt-le-Grand

- Coat of arms
- Location of Seraucourt-le-Grand
- Location within France Location within Hauts-de-France
- Coordinates: 49°46′51″N 3°12′48″E
- Country: France
- Region: Hauts-de-France
- Department: Aisne
- Arrondissement: Saint-Quentin
- Canton: Ribemont
- Intercommunality: CA Saint-Quentinois

Government
  - Mayor (2026–32): Cédric Coasne
- Area^{1}: 10.56 km^{2} (4.08 sq mi)
- Elevation: 100 m (330 ft)
- Highest elevation: 99 m (325 ft)
- Lowest elevation: 67 m (220 ft)
- Population (2023): 706
  - Density: 66.9/km^{2} (173/sq mi)
- Time zone: UTC+01:00 (CET)
  - Summer (DST): UTC+02:00 (CEST)
- INSEE/Postal code: 02710 /02790
- ^{1} French Land Register data, which excludes lakes, ponds, glaciers > 1 km^{2} (0.386 sq mi or 247 acres) and river estuaries.

Seraucourt-le-Grand (French pronunciation: [səʁokuʁ lə ɡʁɑ̃]) is a commune in the Aisne department in Hauts-de-France in northern France.

== Population ==
Historical population
Year	Pop.	±% p.a.
1968	540	—
1975	544	+0.11%
1982	614	+1.74%
1990	738	+2.33%
1999	715	−0.35%
2007	783	+1.14%
2012	784	+0.03%
2017	769	−0.39%
2023	706	−1.41%
Source: INSEE

== See also ==
- Communes of the Aisne department
