= Bray-Saint-Christophe =

- Commune
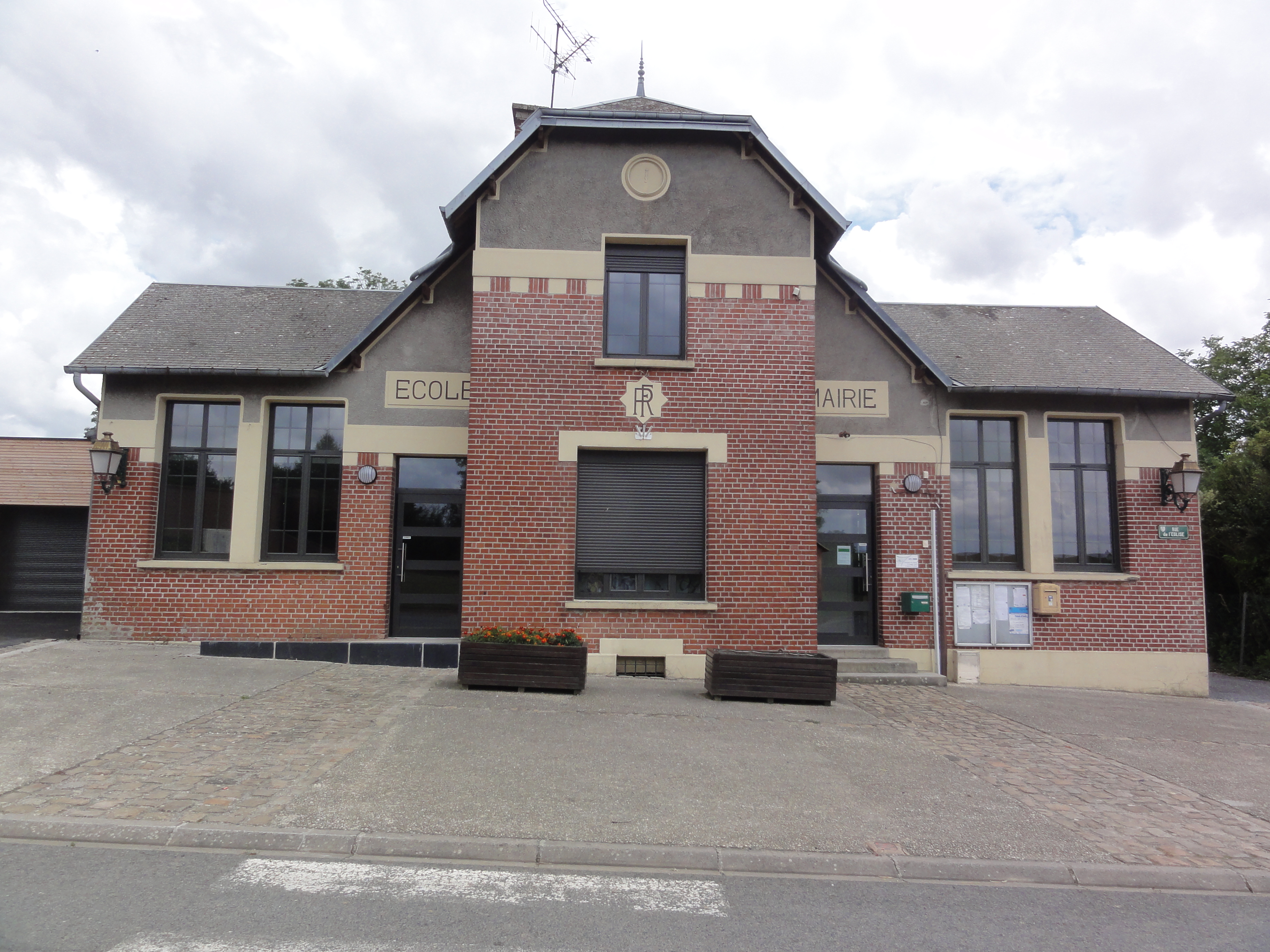
- The town hall and school of Bray-Saint-Christophe
- Location of Bray-Saint-Christophe
- Location within France Location within Hauts-de-France
- Coordinates: 49°46′17″N 3°08′41″E
- Country: France
- Region: Hauts-de-France
- Department: Aisne
- Arrondissement: Saint-Quentin
- Canton: Ribemont
- Intercommunality: CA Saint-Quentinois

Government
  - Mayor (2026–32): Benoît Legrand
- Area^{1}: 2.88 km^{2} (1.11 sq mi)
- Elevation: 68 m (223 ft)
- Highest elevation: 91 m (299 ft)
- Lowest elevation: 66 m (217 ft)
- Population (2023): 64
  - Density: 22/km^{2} (58/sq mi)
- Time zone: UTC+01:00 (CET)
  - Summer (DST): UTC+02:00 (CEST)
- INSEE/Postal code: 02117 /02480
- ^{1} French Land Register data, which excludes lakes, ponds, glaciers > 1 km^{2} (0.386 sq mi or 247 acres) and river estuaries.

Bray-Saint-Christophe (French pronunciation: [bʁɛ sɛ̃ kʁistɔf]) is a commune in the department of Aisne in Hauts-de-France in northern France.

== Population ==
Historical population
Year	Pop.	±% p.a.
1968	83	—
1975	67	−3.01%
1982	55	−2.78%
1990	72	+3.42%
1999	68	−0.63%
2007	78	+1.73%
2012	75	−0.78%
2017	67	−2.23%
2023	64	−0.76%
Source: INSEE

== See also ==
- Communes of the Aisne department
