= Saint-Simon, Aisne =

Saint-Simon
- Commune
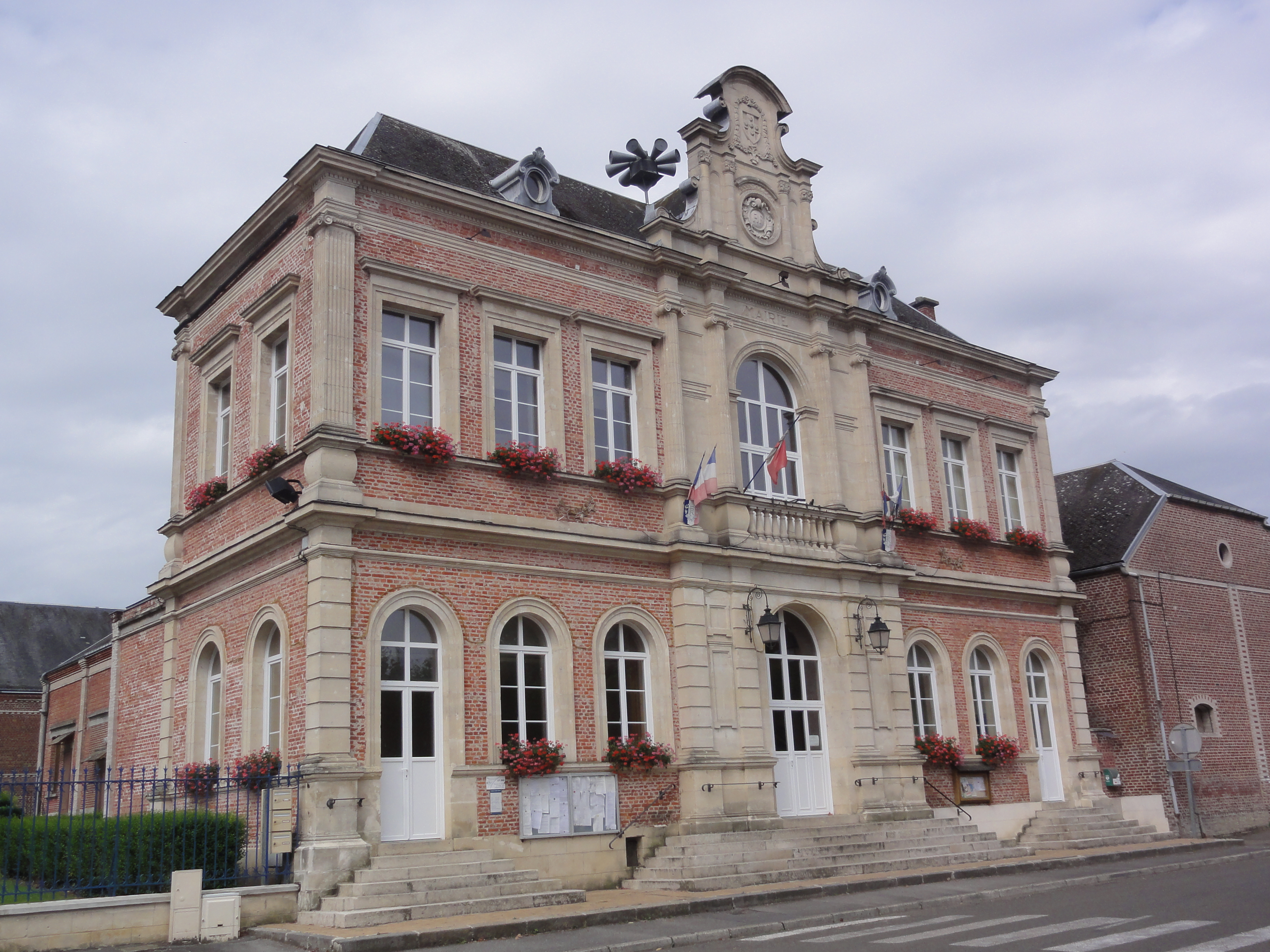
- The town hall of Saint-Simon

- Coat of arms
- Location of Saint-Simon
- Location within France Location within Hauts-de-France
- Coordinates: 49°44′44″N 3°10′34″E
- Country: France
- Region: Hauts-de-France
- Department: Aisne
- Arrondissement: Saint-Quentin
- Canton: Ribemont
- Intercommunality: CA Saint-Quentinois

Government
  - Mayor (2026–32): Agnès Mauger
- Area^{1}: 6.34 km^{2} (2.45 sq mi)
- Elevation: 68 m (223 ft)
- Highest elevation: 89 m (292 ft)
- Lowest elevation: 62 m (203 ft)
- Population (2023): 593
  - Density: 93.5/km^{2} (242/sq mi)
- Time zone: UTC+01:00 (CET)
  - Summer (DST): UTC+02:00 (CEST)
- INSEE/Postal code: 02694 /02640
- ^{1} French Land Register data, which excludes lakes, ponds, glaciers > 1 km^{2} (0.386 sq mi or 247 acres) and river estuaries.

Saint-Simon (French pronunciation: [sɛ̃ simɔ̃]) is a commune in the Aisne department in Hauts-de-France in northern France.

== History ==
This place was the property of the House of Rouvroy, who became the Duke of Saint-Simon.

== Population ==
Historical population
Year	Pop.	±% p.a.
1968	564	—
1975	530	−0.88%
1982	600	+1.79%
1990	687	+1.71%
1999	651	−0.60%
2007	636	−0.29%
2012	605	−0.99%
2017	635	+0.97%
2023	593	−1.13%
Source: INSEE

== See also ==
- Communes of the Aisne department
