= Canton of Le Catelet =

Coordinates: 50°00′N 3°15′E

Le Catelet
- Former canton
- Interactive map of Le Catelet
- Country: France
- Region: Hauts-de-France
- Department: Aisne
- No. of communes: {{{nbcomm}}}
- Disbanded: 2015
- Area: 139.26 km^{2} (53.77 sq mi)
- Population (2012): 8,537
  - Density: 61.30/km^{2} (158.8/sq mi)

The canton of Le Catelet is a former administrative division in northern France. It was disbanded following the French canton reorganisation which came into effect in March 2015. It consisted of 18 communes, which joined the canton of Bohain-en-Vermandois in 2015. It had 8,537 inhabitants (2012).

The canton comprised the following communes:

- Aubencheul-aux-Bois
- Beaurevoir
- Bellenglise
- Bellicourt
- Bony
- Le Catelet
- Estrées
- Gouy
- Hargicourt
- Joncourt
- Lehaucourt
- Lempire
- Levergies
- Magny-la-Fosse
- Nauroy
- Sequehart
- Vendhuile
- Villeret

== See also ==
- List of cantons of France
