= Aisonville-et-Bernoville =

- Commune
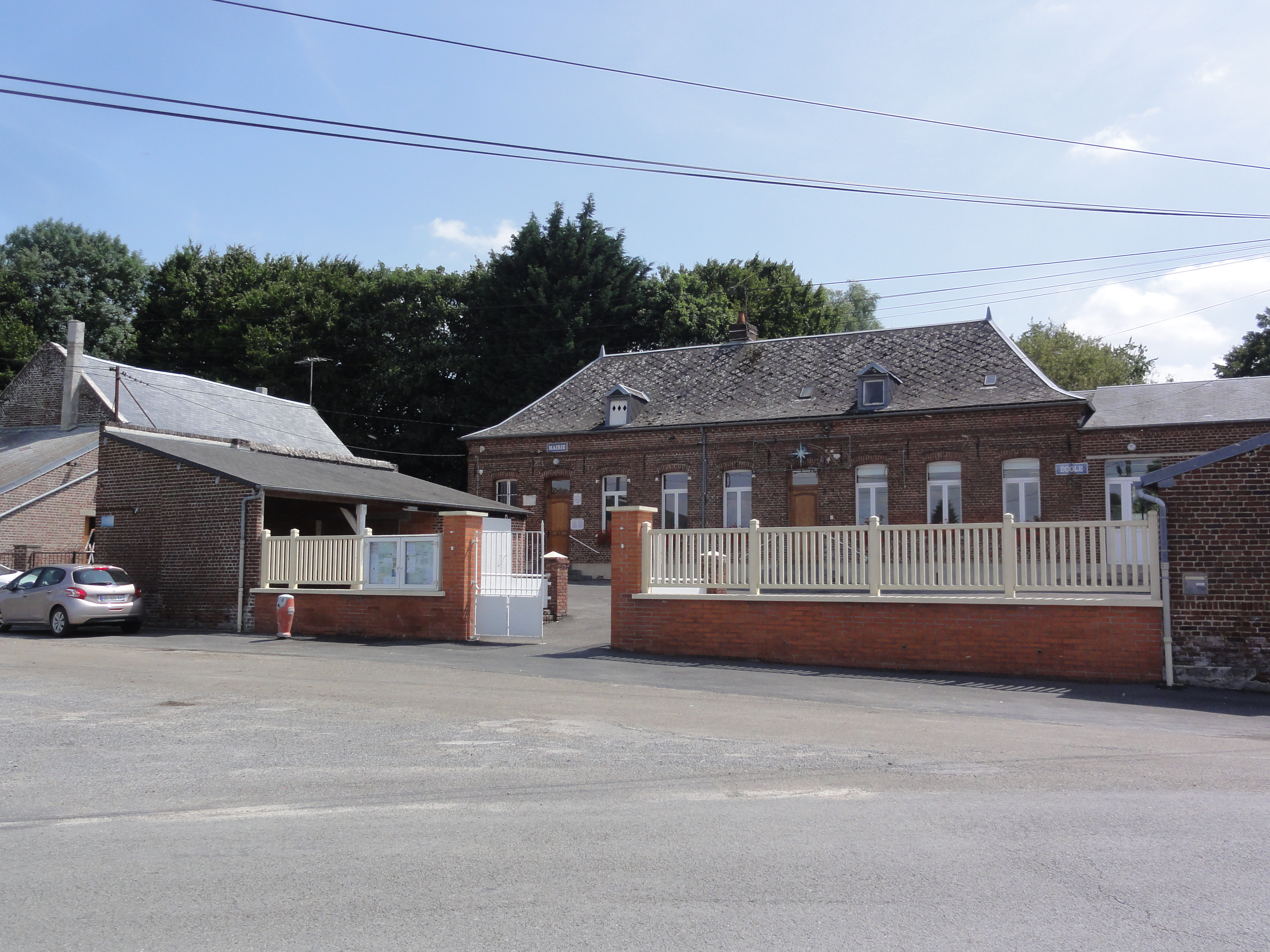
- Town hall

- Coat of arms
- Location of Aisonville-et-Bernoville
- Location within France Location within Hauts-de-France
- Coordinates: 49°56′05″N 3°31′21″E
- Country: France
- Region: Hauts-de-France
- Department: Aisne
- Arrondissement: Vervins
- Canton: Guise
- Intercommunality: Thiérache Sambre et Oise

Government
  - Mayor (2026–32): Guillaume Dujardin
- Area^{1}: 8.73 km^{2} (3.37 sq mi)
- Elevation: 166 m (545 ft)
- Highest elevation: 166 m (545 ft)
- Lowest elevation: 108 m (354 ft)
- Population (2023): 259
  - Density: 29.7/km^{2} (76.8/sq mi)
- Time zone: UTC+01:00 (CET)
  - Summer (DST): UTC+02:00 (CEST)
- INSEE/Postal code: 02006 /02110
- ^{1} French Land Register data, which excludes lakes, ponds, glaciers > 1 km^{2} (0.386 sq mi or 247 acres) and river estuaries.

Aisonville-et-Bernoville is a commune in the department of Aisne in the Hauts-de-France region of northern France.

== Geography ==
The commune is some 15 km north-east of Saint-Quentin and some 8 km north-west of Guise. The commune can be accessed from Etaves-et-Bocquiaux in the west by road D31 which runs east into the commune and into the town where it joins road D960 which runs northwest to Bohain-en-Vermandois and south-east to join road D68. Road D68 also runs from the town north-east to Grougis and south-west to Montigny-en-Arrouaise. Road D67 runs from Remaucort to near the Oise river form the southern border of the commune. The commune is almost all farmland except for a small area of forest near the town. There is only one other hamlet - that of Bernoville - which is close to the main town.

== History ==
From 10 to 18 October 1918, the Battle of Aisonville-et-Bernoville was dominated by nearly 10 French regiments who overcame a powerful German army entrenched in the village. On the French side there were two thousand casualties, including 400 deaths.

== Population ==
Historical population
Year	Pop.	±% p.a.
1968	343	—
1975	300	−1.90%
1982	251	−2.52%
1990	216	−1.86%
1999	291	+3.37%
2007	295	+0.17%
2012	274	−1.47%
2017	255	−1.43%
2023	259	+0.26%
Source: INSEE

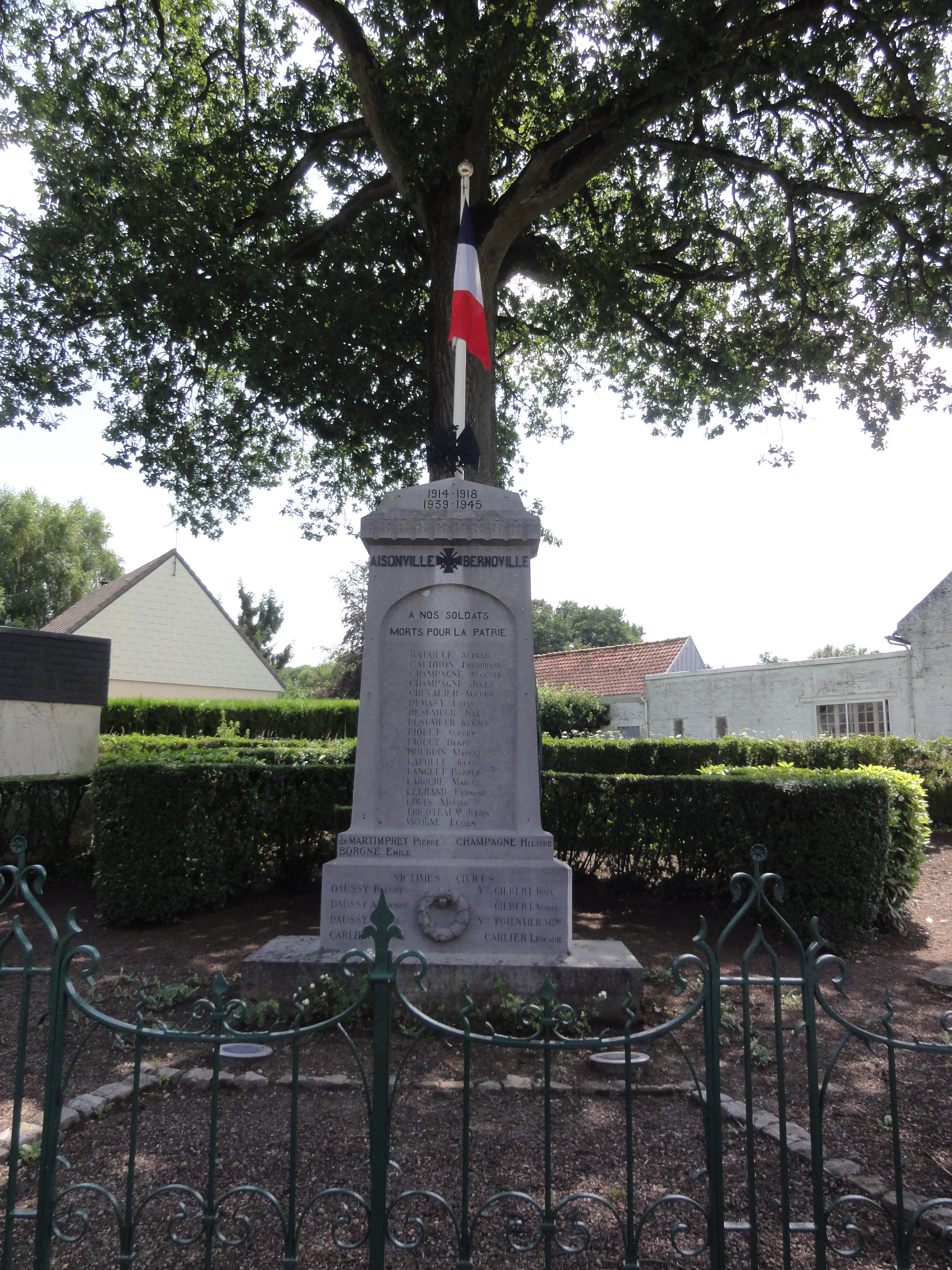
The War Memorial

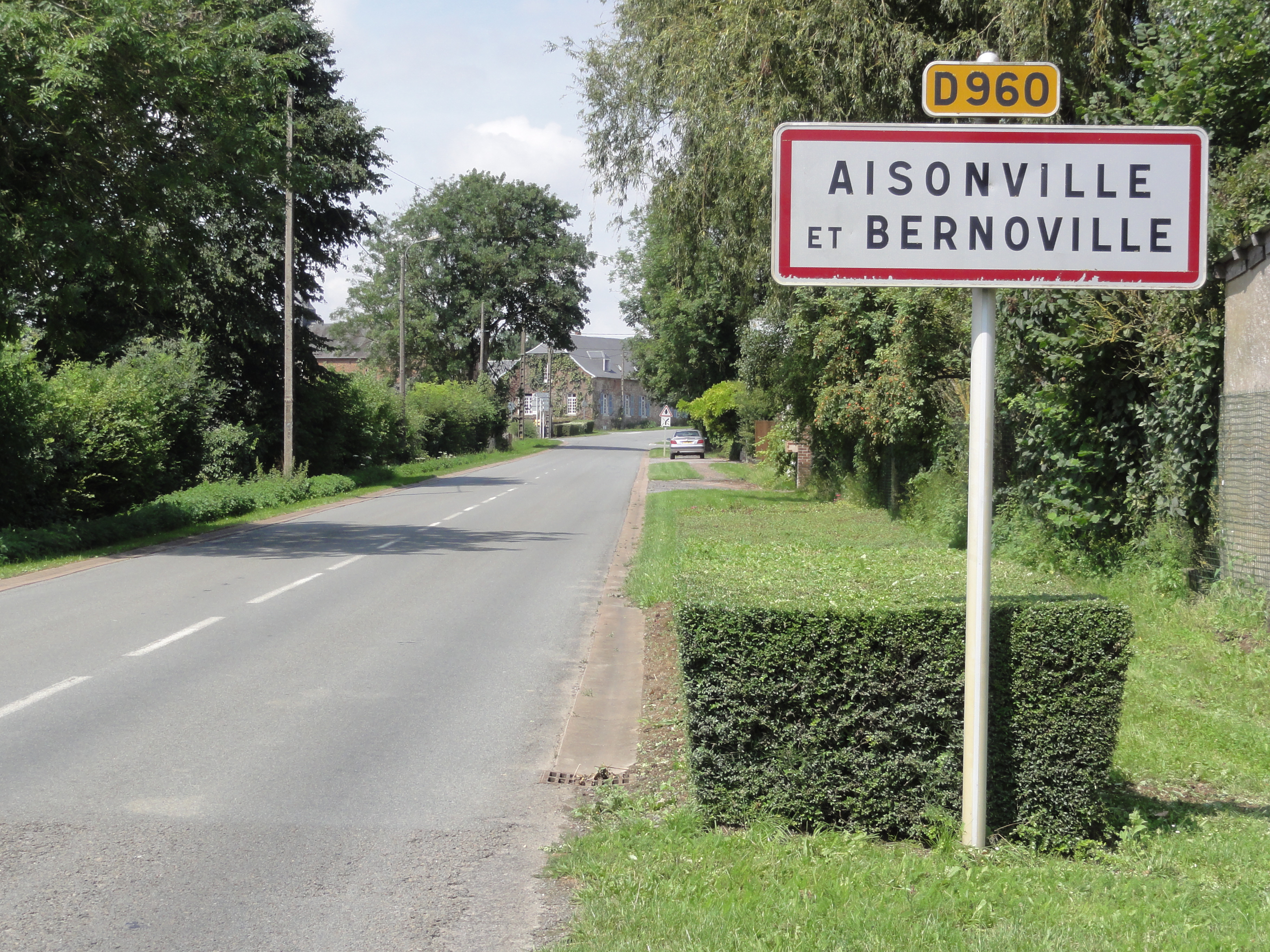
The entrance to the village

== Culture and heritage ==
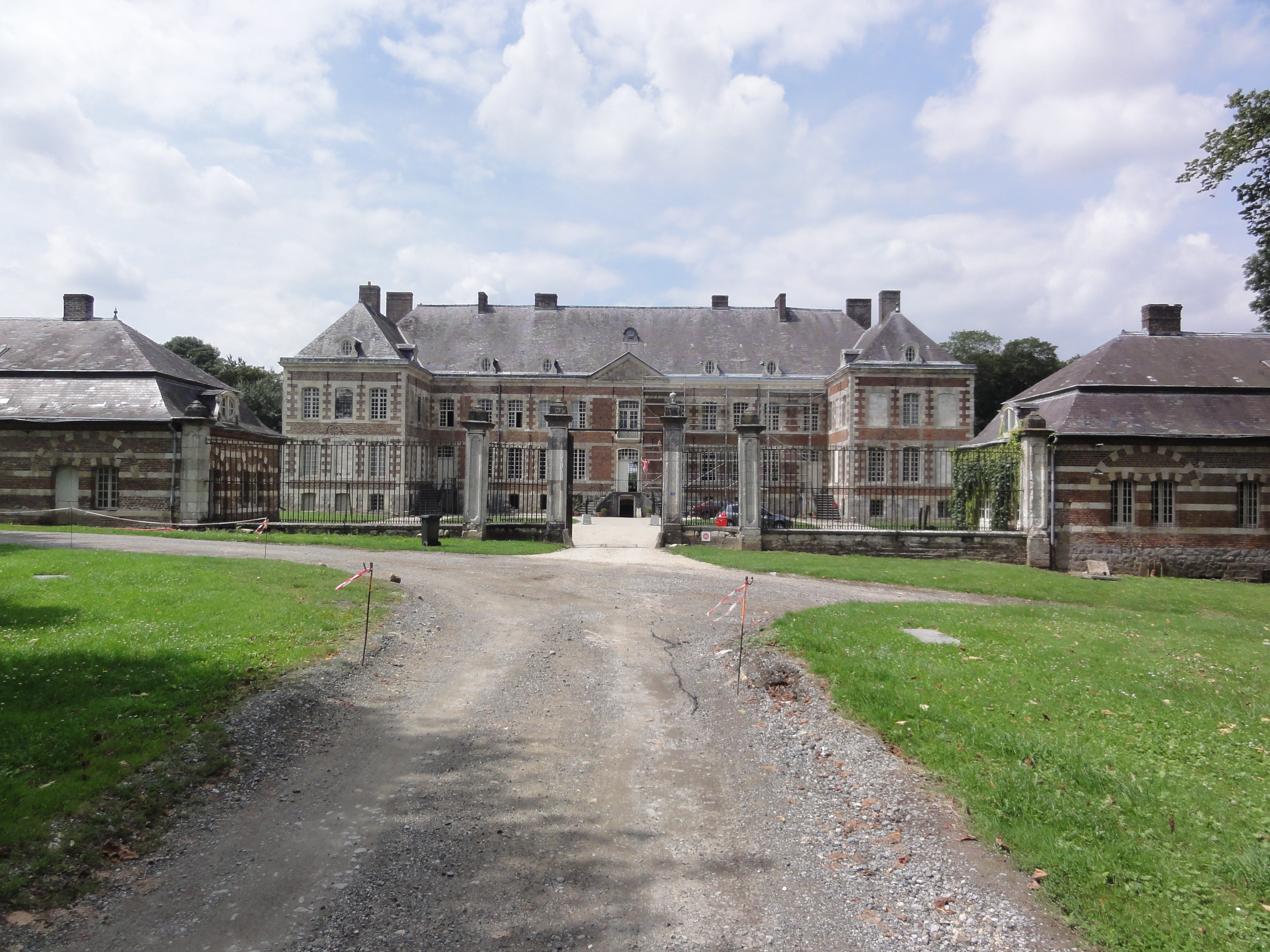
The Château de Bernoville

=== Civil heritage ===
The commune has a one building that is registered as an historical monument:

- The Château de Bernoville (19th century) is of a regional architecture in brick and stone. The old stables have been converted into a three-star hotel.

=== Religious heritage ===
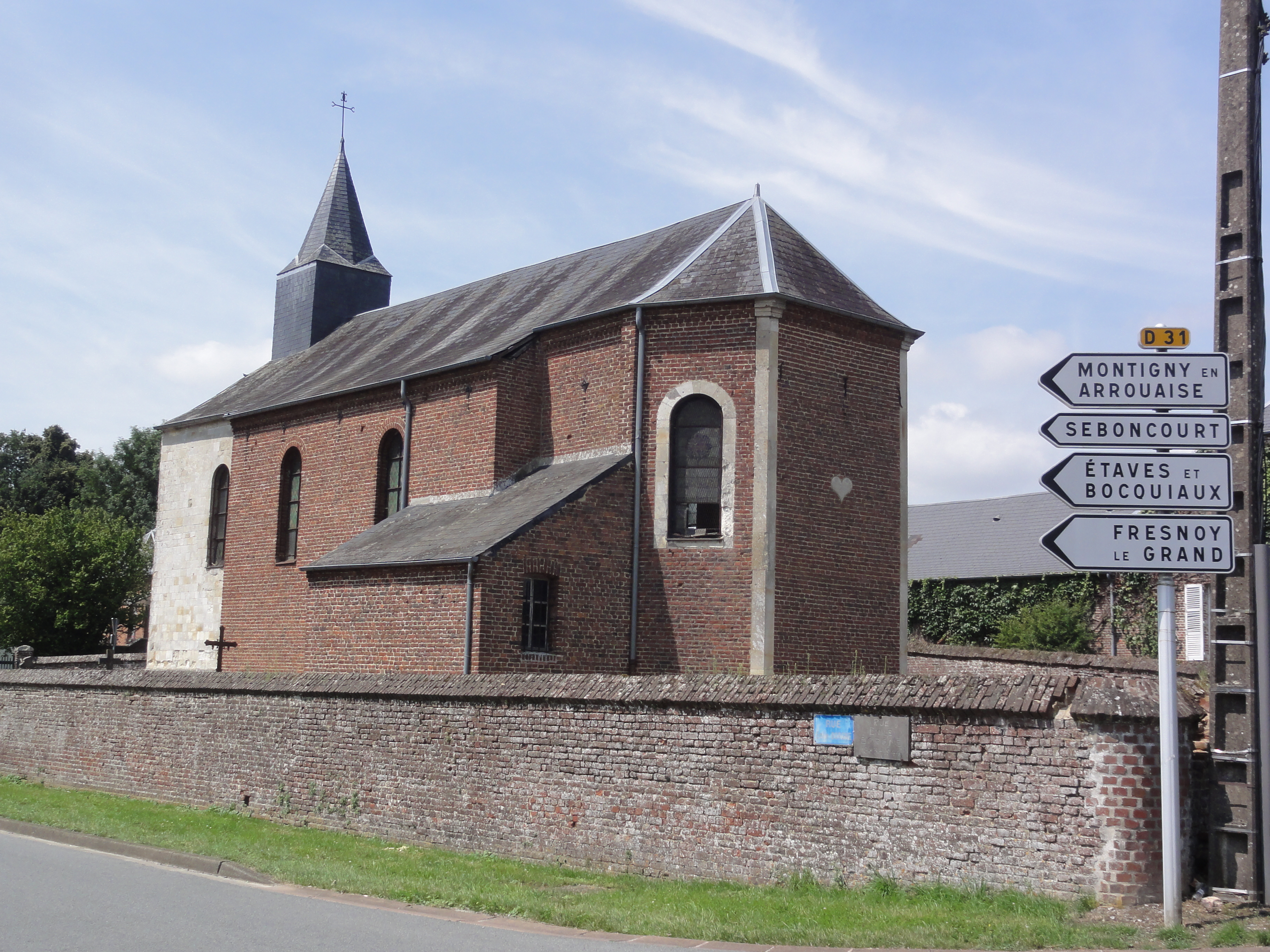
The Parish Church of Notre-Dame

The commune has two religious buildings that are registered as historical monuments:

- The Parish Church of Notre-Dame de la Nativité (18th century). The church contains many items that are registered as historical objects:
  - A Eucharistic Suspension (17th century)
  - An Altar painting: the Assumption (17th century)
  - A Retable (19th century)
  - The Main Altar (18th century)
  - The Main Altar retable and painting (17th century)
  - A Painting: Nativité Puységur (17th century)
  - A Statue: Virgin and Child (19th century)
  - A Cross: Christ on the Cross (17th century)
- The former Parish Church of Saint-Jean (1841). The church contains one item that is registered as an historical object:
  - A painting and frame: the Education of Christ (17th century)

== Notable people linked to the communes ==
- Dame Marie Martine Camps-Laurent, wife of Ferdinand de l'Epine was the Lady of Bernoville, Aisonville, and of Roberfart and other places. She died in 1777 and her will, which was dated 10 May 1774, made her husband her sole heir but was annulled by a decree of the parliament of Paris on 1 September 1780.

== See also ==
- Communes of the Aisne department
