= Premont =

Premont may refer to

- Premont, Texas, a city in the Jim Wells County, Texas
- Prémont, a French commune in the Aisne department
