= Hargicourt =

Hargicourt may refer to the following places in France:

- Hargicourt, Aisne, a commune in the department of Aisne
- Hargicourt, Somme, a commune in the department of Somme
