= Becquigny =

Becquigny may refer to the following places in France:

- Becquigny, Aisne, a commune in the department of Aisne
- Becquigny, Somme, a commune in the department of Somme
