= Brancourt-le-Grand =

- Commune
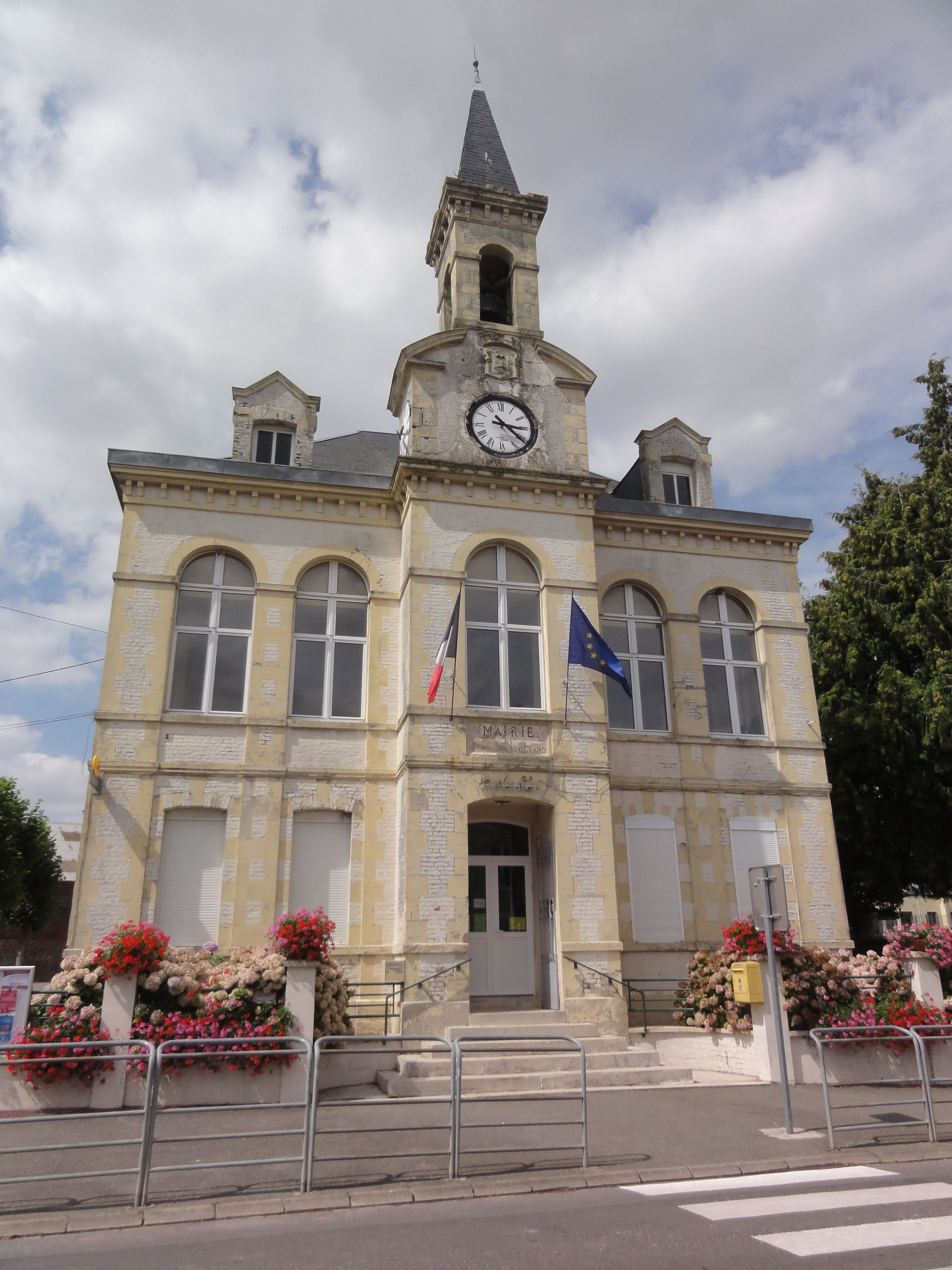
- The town hall of Brancourt-le-Grand

- Coat of arms
- Location of Brancourt-le-Grand
- Location within France Location within Hauts-de-France
- Coordinates: 49°58′37″N 3°22′56″E
- Country: France
- Region: Hauts-de-France
- Department: Aisne
- Arrondissement: Saint-Quentin
- Canton: Bohain-en-Vermandois
- Intercommunality: Pays du Vermandois

Government
  - Mayor (2026–32): Franck Moiret
- Area^{1}: 13.14 km^{2} (5.07 sq mi)
- Elevation: 126 m (413 ft)
- Highest elevation: 159 m (522 ft)
- Lowest elevation: 120 m (390 ft)
- Population (2023): 554
  - Density: 42.2/km^{2} (109/sq mi)
- Time zone: UTC+01:00 (CET)
  - Summer (DST): UTC+02:00 (CEST)
- INSEE/Postal code: 02112 /02110
- ^{1} French Land Register data, which excludes lakes, ponds, glaciers > 1 km^{2} (0.386 sq mi or 247 acres) and river estuaries.

Brancourt-le-Grand (French pronunciation: [bʁɑ̃kuʁ lə ɡʁɑ̃]) is a commune in the department of Aisne in Hauts-de-France in northern France.

== Population ==
Historical population
Year	Pop.	±% p.a.
1968	706	—
1975	618	−1.88%
1982	577	−0.98%
1990	569	−0.17%
1999	636	+1.24%
2007	622	−0.28%
2012	615	−0.23%
2017	565	−1.68%
2023	554	−0.33%
Source: INSEE

== See also ==
- Communes of the Aisne department
