= Fontaine-Uterte =

- Commune
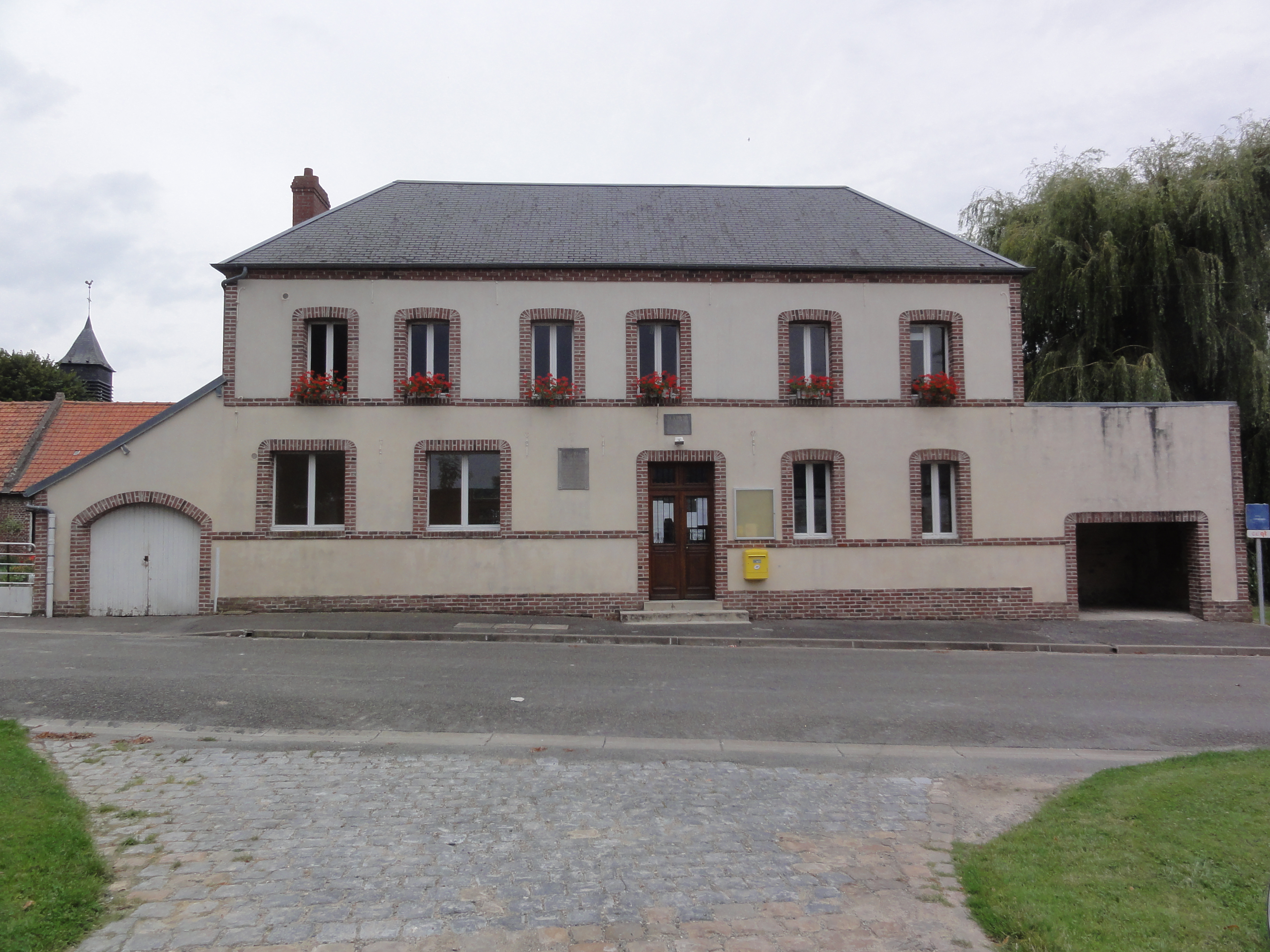
- The town hall and school of Fontaine-Uterte
- Location of Fontaine-Uterte
- Location within France Location within Hauts-de-France
- Coordinates: 49°55′19″N 3°22′12″E
- Country: France
- Region: Hauts-de-France
- Department: Aisne
- Arrondissement: Saint-Quentin
- Canton: Bohain-en-Vermandois
- Intercommunality: Pays du Vermandois

Government
  - Mayor (2026–32): Franck Gonthier
- Area^{1}: 5.77 km^{2} (2.23 sq mi)
- Elevation: 145 m (476 ft)
- Highest elevation: 144 m (472 ft)
- Lowest elevation: 98 m (322 ft)
- Population (2023): 140
  - Density: 24/km^{2} (63/sq mi)
- Time zone: UTC+01:00 (CET)
  - Summer (DST): UTC+02:00 (CEST)
- INSEE/Postal code: 02323 /02110
- ^{1} French Land Register data, which excludes lakes, ponds, glaciers > 1 km^{2} (0.386 sq mi or 247 acres) and river estuaries.

Fontaine-Uterte is a commune in the Aisne department in Hauts-de-France in northern France.

== Population ==
Historical population
Year	Pop.	±% p.a.
1968	165	—
1975	205	+3.15%
1982	159	−3.56%
1990	135	−2.02%
1999	119	−1.39%
2007	111	−0.87%
2012	127	+2.73%
2017	127	+0.00%
2023	140	+1.64%
Source: INSEE

== See also ==
- Communes of the Aisne department
