= Aubencheul-aux-Bois =

- Commune
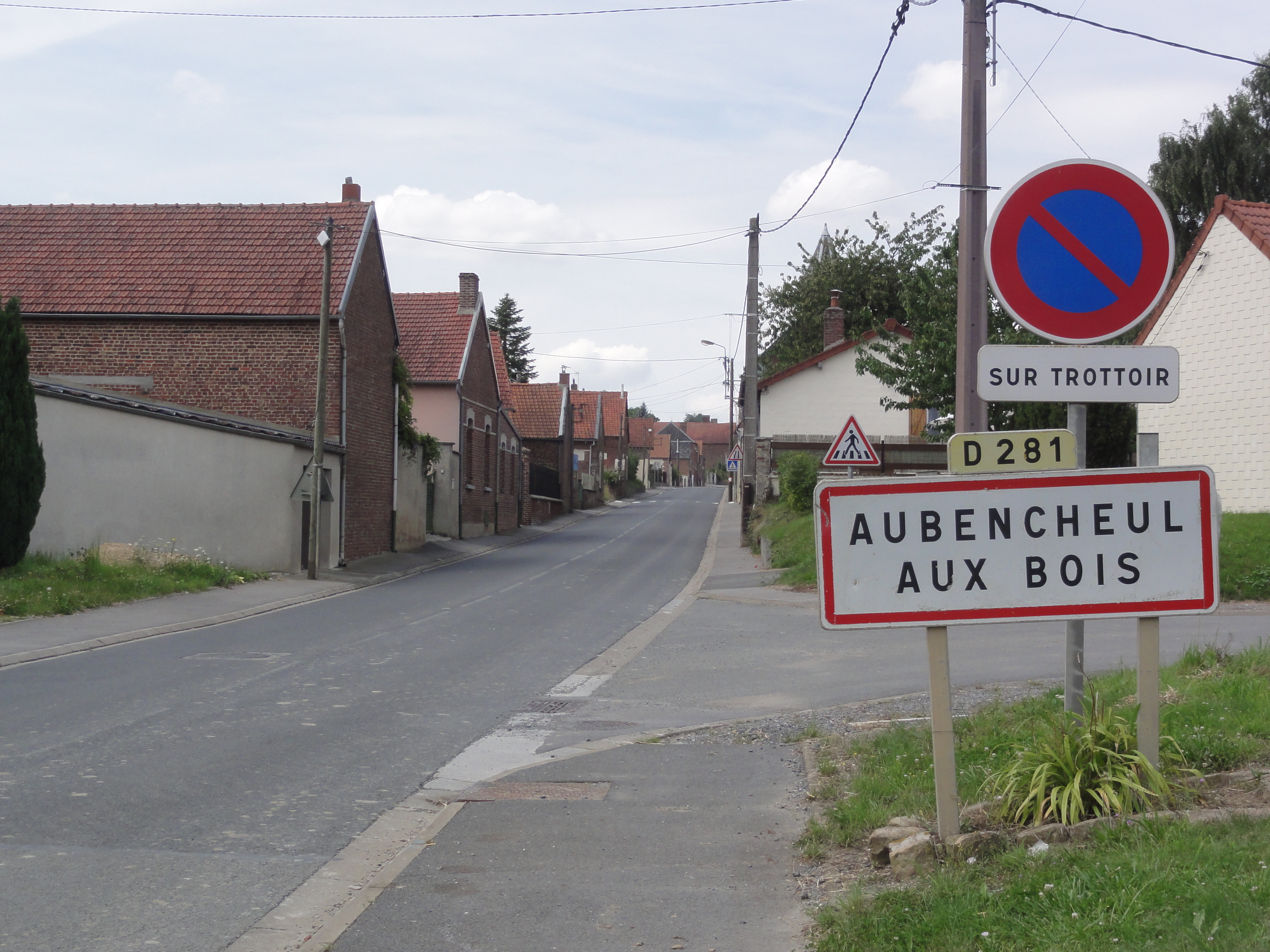
- Location of Aubencheul-aux-Bois
- Location within France Location within Hauts-de-France
- Coordinates: 50°01′46″N 3°15′56″E
- Country: France
- Region: Hauts-de-France
- Department: Aisne
- Arrondissement: Saint-Quentin
- Canton: Bohain-en-Vermandois
- Intercommunality: Pays du Vermandois

Government
  - Mayor (2026–32): Alexandre Passet
- Area^{1}: 2.11 km^{2} (0.81 sq mi)
- Highest elevation: 139 m (456 ft)
- Lowest elevation: 105 m (344 ft)
- Population (2023): 238
  - Density: 113/km^{2} (292/sq mi)
- Time zone: UTC+01:00 (CET)
  - Summer (DST): UTC+02:00 (CEST)
- INSEE/Postal code: 02030 /02420
- ^{1} French Land Register data, which excludes lakes, ponds, glaciers > 1 km^{2} (0.386 sq mi or 247 acres) and river estuaries.

Aubencheul-aux-Bois (French pronunciation: [obɑ̃ʃœl o bwa]) is a commune in the department of Aisne in the Hauts-de-France region of northern France.

== Geography ==
Aubencheul-aux-Bois is located some 20 km south of Cambrai and 30 km east of Combles. The northwest border of the commune is the border between Aisne and Nord departments. The D6 44 road from La Gaité in the north runs south along the western border of the commune changing to D 1044 in the commune and continuing south to Le Catelet. The D 16 road runs east from the D6 44 to the village changing to D 281 within the commune then continuing east as the D 16 to Villers-Outréaux. The commune is composed entirely of farmland.

Two streams rise in the commune, one flowing southwest and the other flowing east.

== History ==
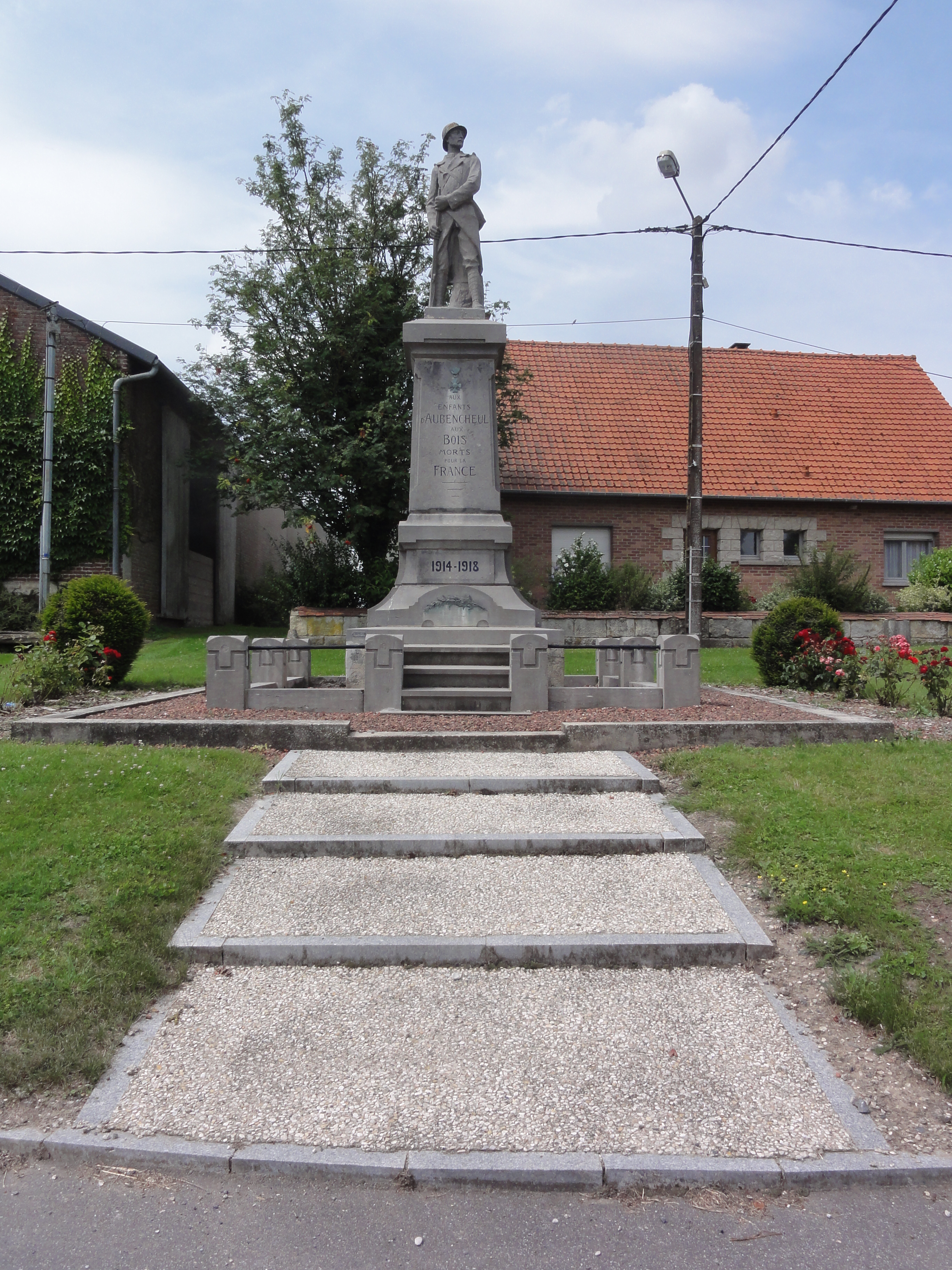
The War memorial

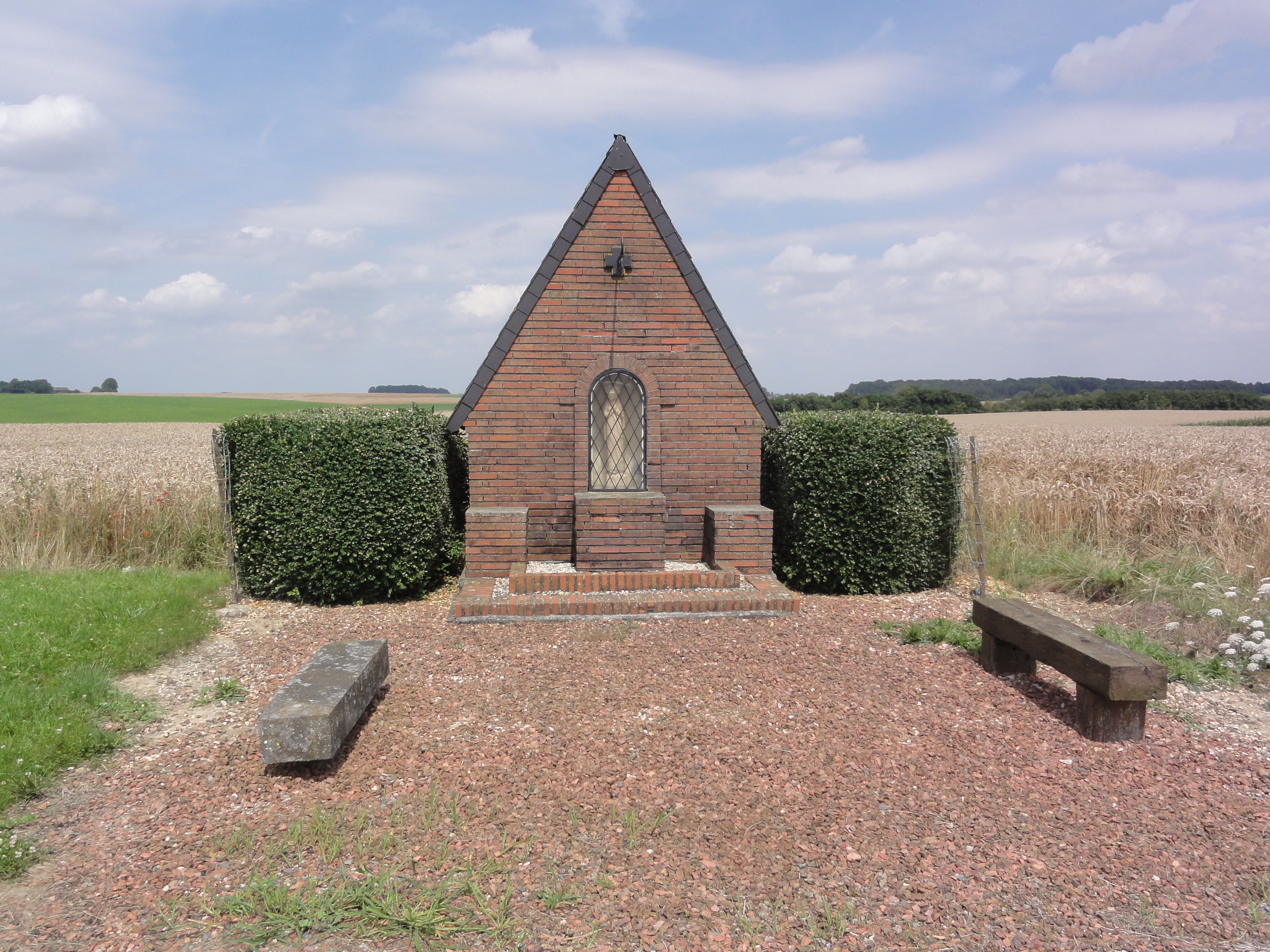
An Oratory in the commune

Aubencheul-aux-Bois was the seat of a small abbey founded in the 11th century in the middle of the forest of Arrouaise. It was part of the province of Cambrésis. The village was ravaged in 1584 by the Duke of Parma and in 1636 by the Spaniards. The first inhabitants back to 1663 were the families of Loubry, Lévêque, Grau, Deboucq, Dessains, Dessenne, Guéguin, Carpentier, Milhem, Ferlier, Fichaux, Bernerd, Biar, Simon, Val, Bancourt, Noblécourt, Dubois, Caré, Faucon, Dazin, Savary, Malézieux, Lanthoine, Coupé, Pattée, Dambraine, Gressier, Thibaut, Billon, Domont, and Bantigny. On 16 July 1735, after five days of strong winds, a swarm of grasshoppers destroyed the stocks of straw and hay. There was a shortage in 1709 due to the freezing conditions from January to March with most fruit trees and corn crop being destroyed. This happened again in 1740 when poverty was extreme until the end of harvest in 1741 - during the famine the population lost about a quarter of its population. On 15 June 1839 a tornado a mile wide with hail as large as chicken eggs arrived and everything was destroyed. A fire destroyed 63 houses on 17 June 1827. In 1848 there was famine, in 1849 Cholera. The village was almost completely destroyed during the First World War.

== Administration ==
List of Successive Mayors of Aubencheul-aux-Bois

From	To	Name	Party
1708		Louys Caron	
1740	1742	Henri Caron	
1751	1755	Paul Passé	
1758	1765	Alexandre Dominique Passet	
1773		Michel Carron	
1776		Philippe Joseph Caron	
1786	1788	Charles Joseph Passet	
1792		Antoine Joseph Millot	
1792		Maximilien Caré	
1800	1816	Hyacinthe Passet	
1816	1831	Augustin Passet	
1832	1836	Noël Milhem	
1836	1847	Ildefonce Désiré Passet	
1848	1861	Charles Clavier	
1861	1871	Benoît Hyacinthe Passet	
1871	1871	Louis Lévêque	
1871	1875	Eugéne Loubry	
1875	1878	Simon Philemont	
1878	1892	Eugéne Loubry	
1892	1896	Ernest Fontaine	
1896	1904	Charles Passet	
1904		Ernest Passet	
1954		Lucien Passet	
1977	Present	Francis Passet	DVD
2014	2020	Bertrand Bethune	
2020	2026	Francis Passet	DVD
2026	incumbent	Alexandre Passet	

== Population ==
Historical population
Year	Pop.	±% p.a.
1968	332	—
1975	309	−1.02%
1982	300	−0.42%
1990	275	−1.08%
1999	272	−0.12%
2007	305	+1.44%
2012	298	−0.46%
2017	269	−2.03%
2023	238	−2.02%
Source: INSEE

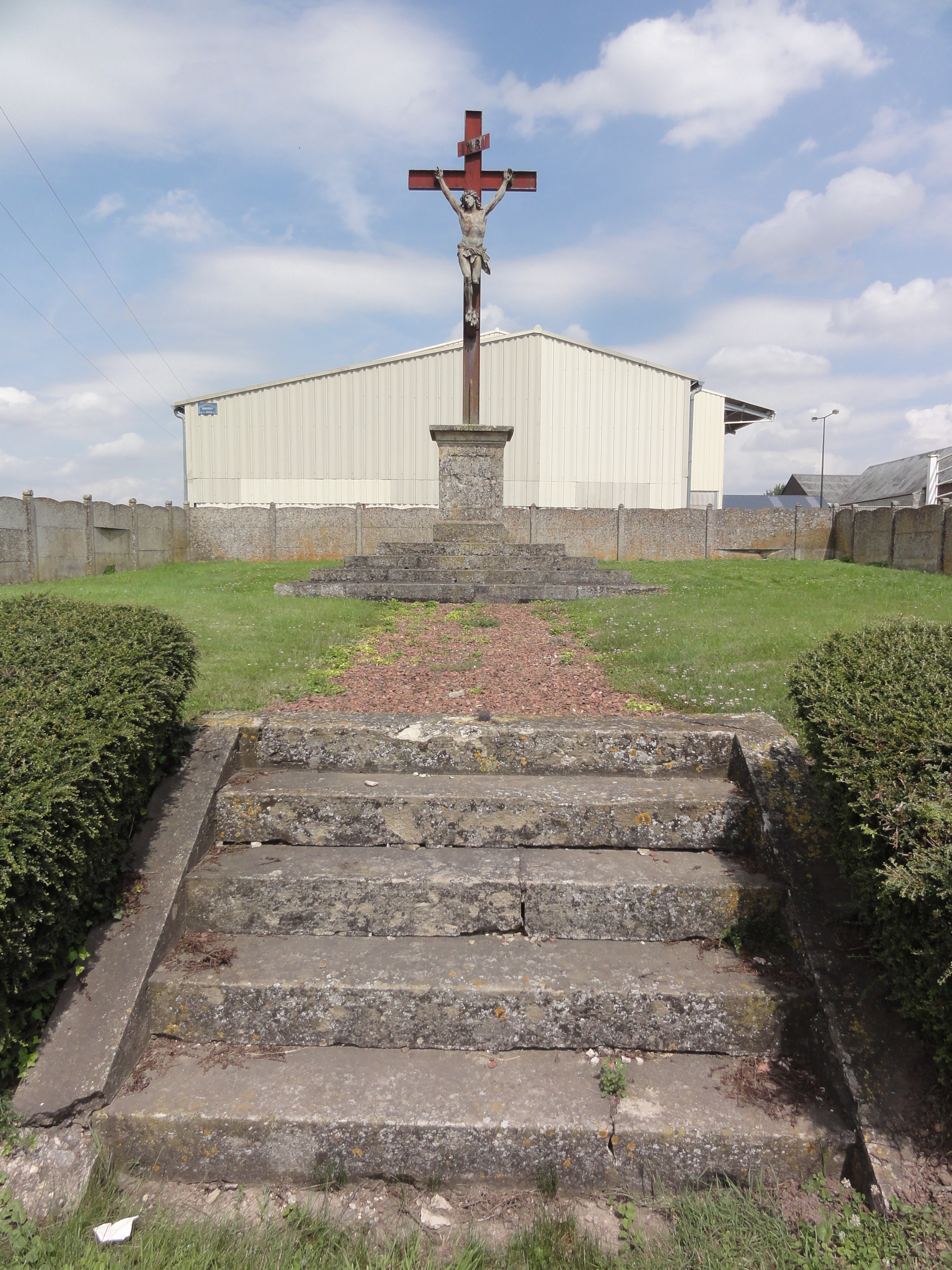
A Wayside Cross in the Commune

== Sites and Monuments ==
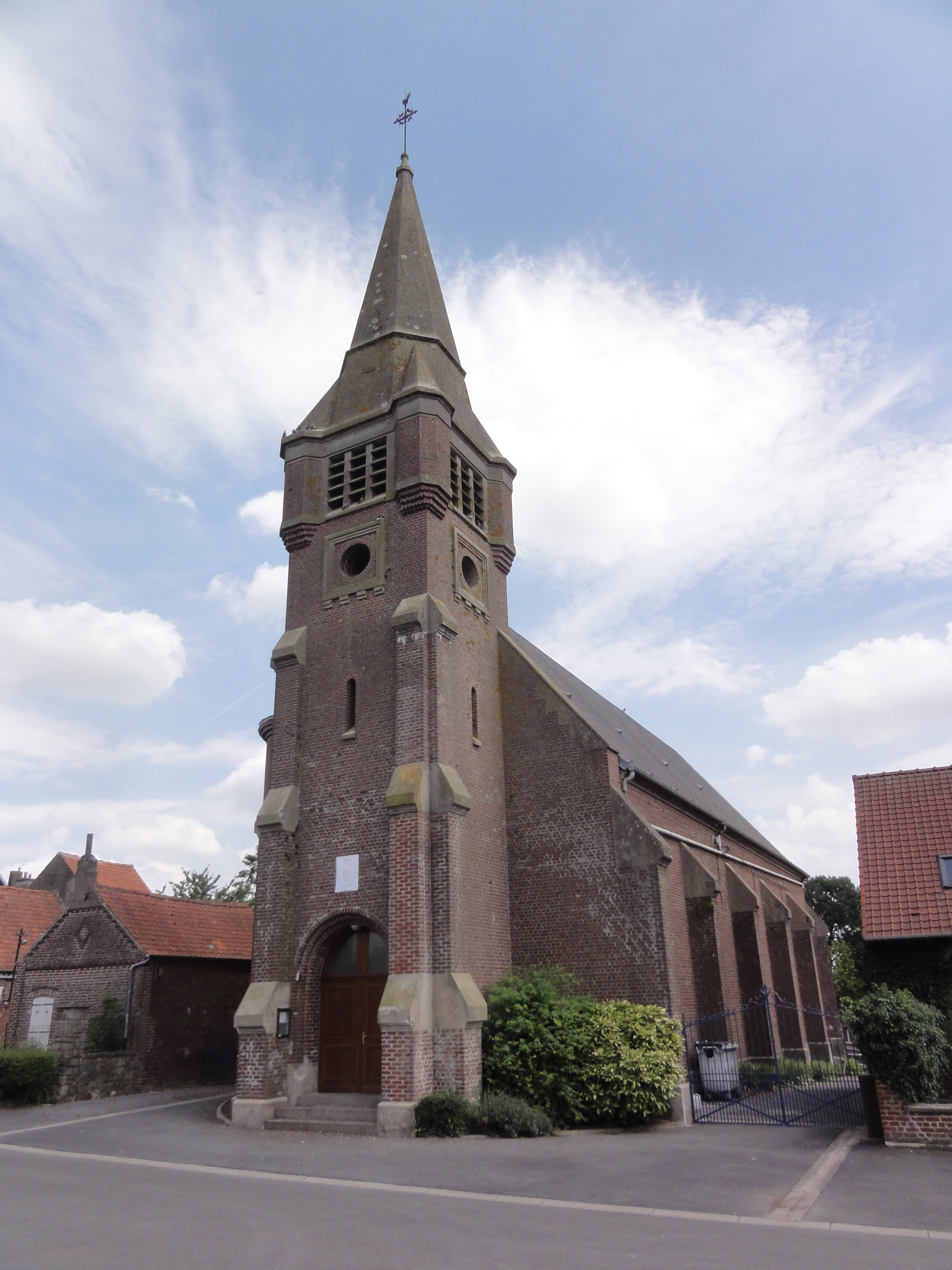
The Church

- A Church, rebuilt after the 1914-18 war in a neo-Romanesque style mostly in brick.

== See also ==
- Communes of the Aisne department

=== External links ===
- Aubencheul-aux-Bois on the old IGN website (in French)
- Aubencheul-aux-Bois on Géoportail, National Geographic Institute (IGN) website (in French)
- Aubancheul aux Bois on the 1750 Cassini Map
