= Croix-Fonsomme =

- Commune
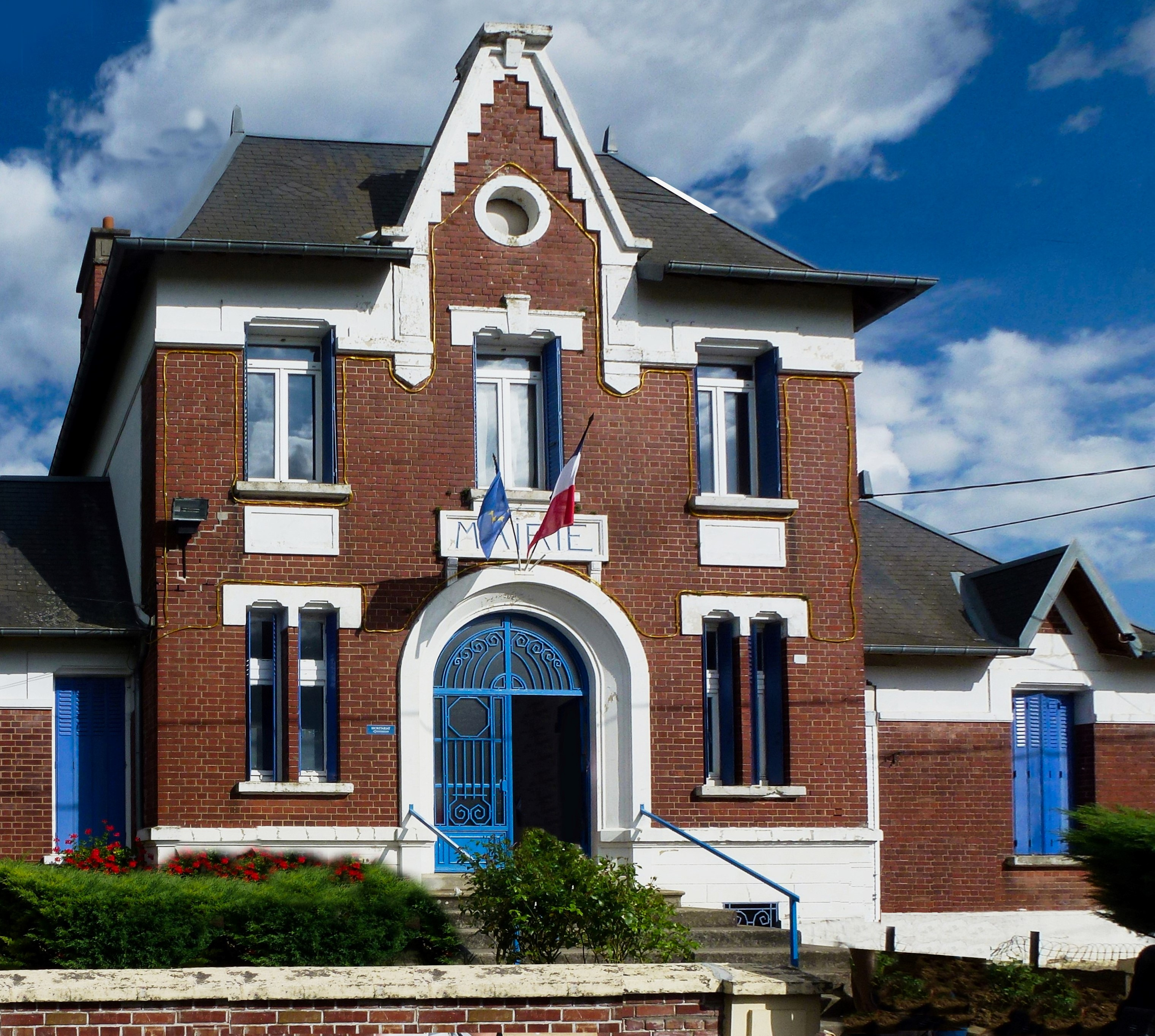
- The town hall of Croix-Fonsomme

- Coat of arms
- Location of Croix-Fonsomme
- Location within France Location within Hauts-de-France
- Coordinates: 49°55′18″N 3°24′11″E
- Country: France
- Region: Hauts-de-France
- Department: Aisne
- Arrondissement: Saint-Quentin
- Canton: Bohain-en-Vermandois
- Intercommunality: Pays du Vermandois

Government
  - Mayor (2026–32): Lilian Morlet
- Area^{1}: 9.37 km^{2} (3.62 sq mi)
- Elevation: 95 m (312 ft)
- Highest elevation: 147 m (482 ft)
- Lowest elevation: 85 m (279 ft)
- Population (2023): 183
  - Density: 19.5/km^{2} (50.6/sq mi)
- Time zone: UTC+01:00 (CET)
  - Summer (DST): UTC+02:00 (CEST)
- INSEE/Postal code: 02240 /02110
- ^{1} French Land Register data, which excludes lakes, ponds, glaciers > 1 km^{2} (0.386 sq mi or 247 acres) and river estuaries.

Croix-Fonsomme (French pronunciation: [kʁwa fɔ̃sɔm]) is a commune in the Aisne department in Hauts-de-France in northern France.

In March, 2011, it changed its name from Croix-Fonsommes to Croix-Fonsomme.

== Population ==
Historical population
| Year | Pop. | ±% p.a. |
|---|---|---|
| 1968 | 242 | — |
| 1975 | 274 | +1.79% |
| 1982 | 293 | +0.96% |
| 1990 | 210 | −4.08% |
| 1999 | 220 | +0.52% |
| 2007 | 226 | +0.34% |
| 2012 | 221 | −0.45% |
| 2017 | 257 | +3.06% |
| 2023 | 183 | −5.50% |
Source: INSEE

== See also ==
- Communes of the Aisne department
