= Serain =

- Commune
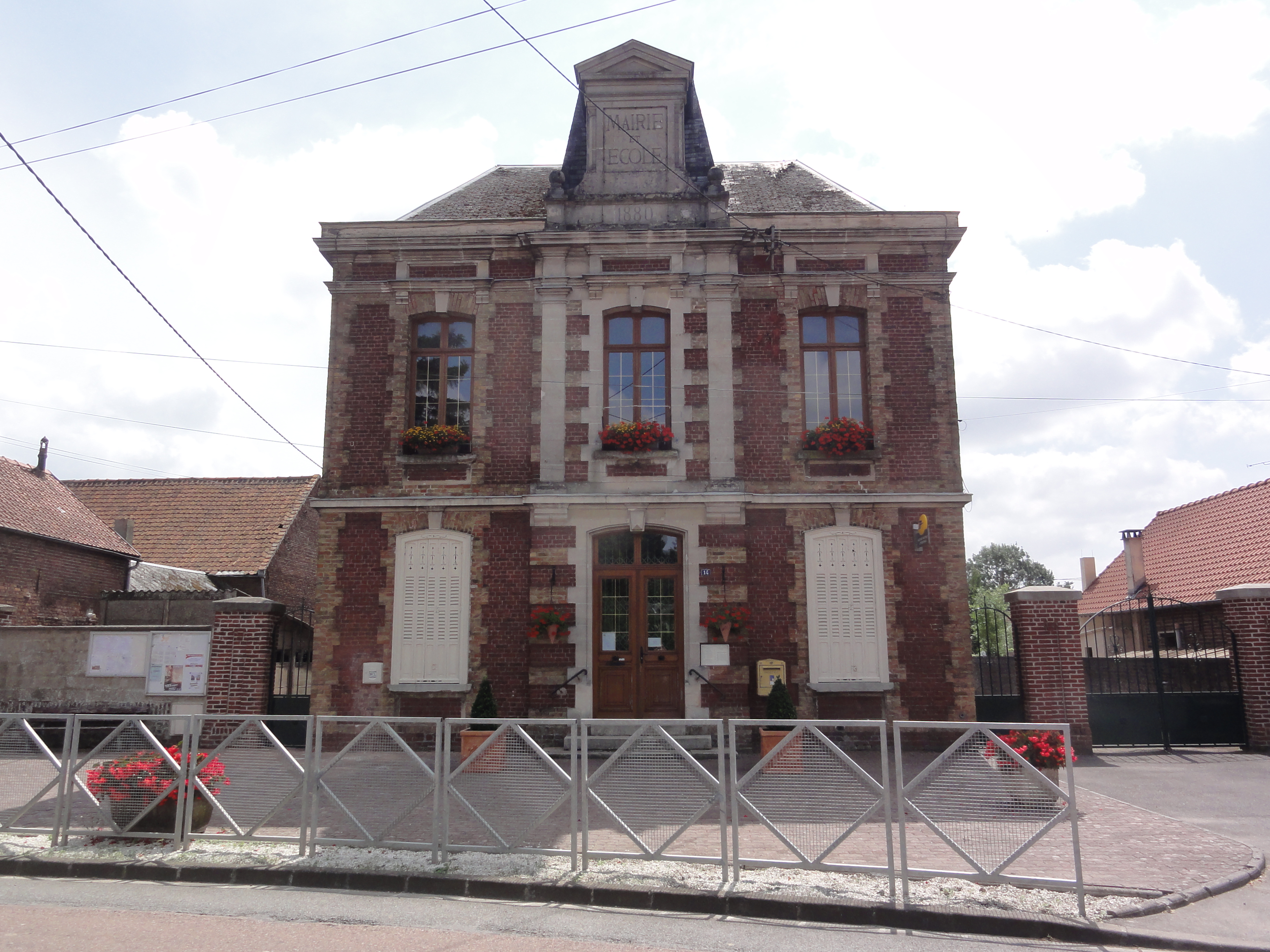
- The town hall and school of Serain

- Coat of arms
- Location of Serain
- Location within France Location within Hauts-de-France
- Coordinates: 50°01′43″N 3°22′00″E
- Country: France
- Region: Hauts-de-France
- Department: Aisne
- Arrondissement: Saint-Quentin
- Canton: Bohain-en-Vermandois
- Intercommunality: Pays du Vermandois

Government
  - Mayor (2026–32): Claude Ceruso
- Area^{1}: 6.65 km^{2} (2.57 sq mi)
- Elevation: 150 m (490 ft)
- Highest elevation: 152 m (499 ft)
- Lowest elevation: 114 m (374 ft)
- Population (2023): 380
  - Density: 57/km^{2} (150/sq mi)
- Time zone: UTC+01:00 (CET)
  - Summer (DST): UTC+02:00 (CEST)
- INSEE/Postal code: 02709 /02110
- ^{1} French Land Register data, which excludes lakes, ponds, glaciers > 1 km^{2} (0.386 sq mi or 247 acres) and river estuaries.

Serain (French pronunciation: [səʁɛ̃]) is a commune in the Aisne department in Hauts-de-France in northern France.

== Population ==
Historical population
| Year | Pop. | ±% p.a. |
|---|---|---|
| 1968 | 534 | — |
| 1975 | 501 | −0.91% |
| 1982 | 459 | −1.24% |
| 1990 | 404 | −1.58% |
| 1999 | 420 | +0.43% |
| 2007 | 390 | −0.92% |
| 2012 | 405 | +0.76% |
| 2017 | 405 | +0.00% |
| 2023 | 380 | −1.06% |
Source: INSEE

== See also ==
- Communes of the Aisne department
