= Prémont =

- Commune
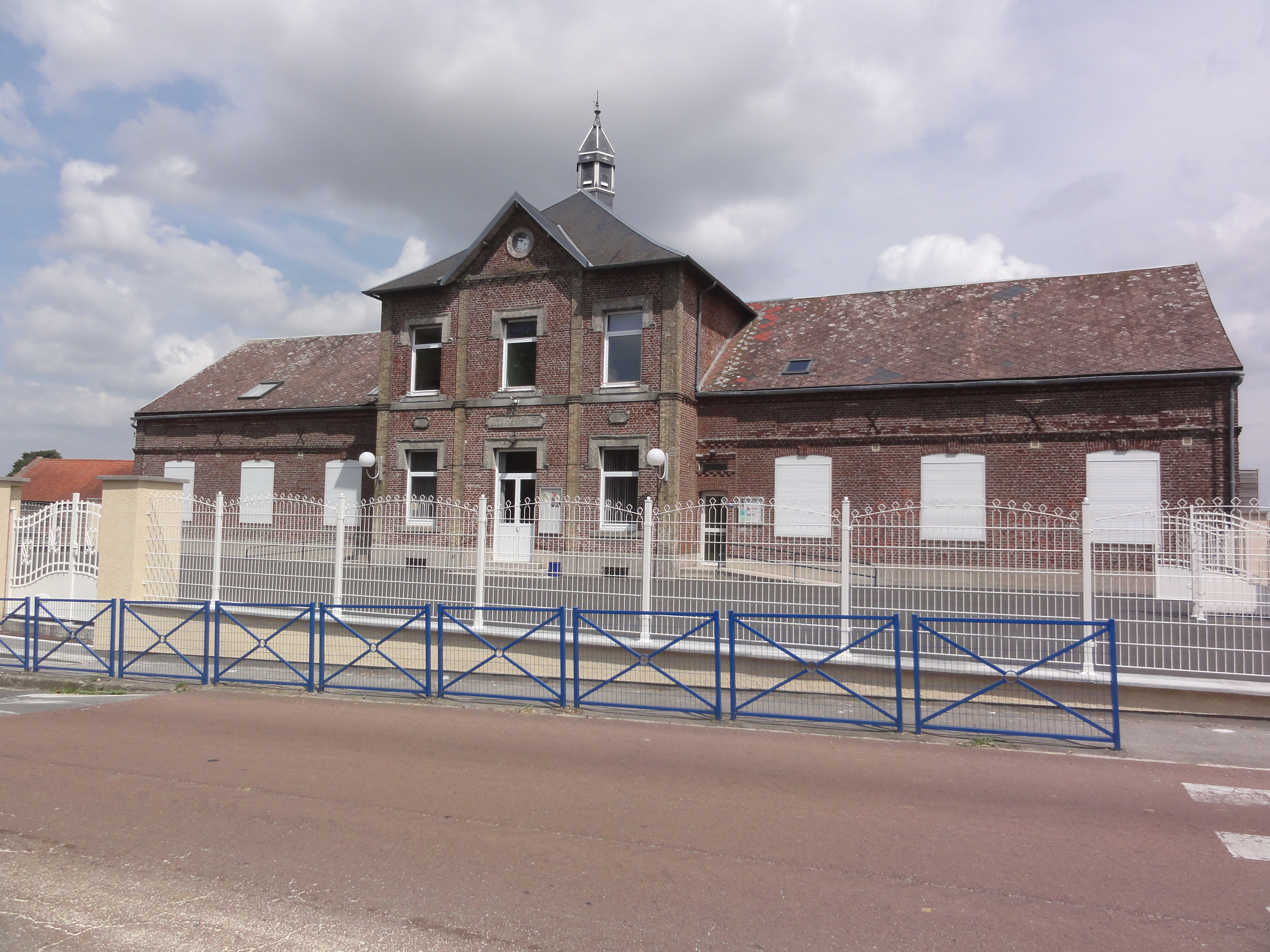
- The town hall and school of Prémont

- Coat of arms
- Location of Prémont
- Location within France Location within Hauts-de-France
- Coordinates: 50°00′49″N 3°23′41″E
- Country: France
- Region: Hauts-de-France
- Department: Aisne
- Arrondissement: Saint-Quentin
- Canton: Bohain-en-Vermandois
- Intercommunality: Pays du Vermandois

Government
  - Mayor (2026–32): Thomas Lecat
- Area^{1}: 12.21 km^{2} (4.71 sq mi)
- Elevation: 130 m (430 ft)
- Highest elevation: 165 m (541 ft)
- Lowest elevation: 112 m (367 ft)
- Population (2023): 683
  - Density: 55.9/km^{2} (145/sq mi)
- Time zone: UTC+01:00 (CET)
  - Summer (DST): UTC+02:00 (CEST)
- INSEE/Postal code: 02618 /02110
- ^{1} French Land Register data, which excludes lakes, ponds, glaciers > 1 km^{2} (0.386 sq mi or 247 acres) and river estuaries.

Prémont (French pronunciation: [pʁemɔ̃]) is a commune in the Aisne department in Hauts-de-France in northern France.

== Population ==
Historical population
Year	Pop.	±% p.a.
1968	750	—
1975	707	−0.84%
1982	701	−0.12%
1990	675	−0.47%
1999	714	+0.63%
2007	715	+0.02%
2012	757	+1.15%
2017	700	−1.55%
2023	683	−0.41%
Source: INSEE

== See also ==
- Communes of the Aisne department
