= Bellicourt =

- Commune
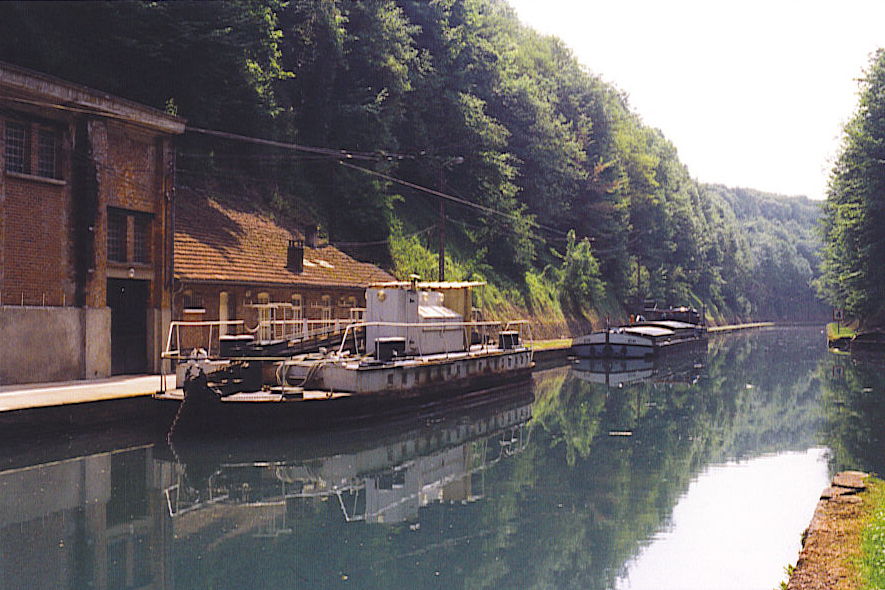
- St. Quentin Canal
- Location of Bellicourt
- Location within France Location within Hauts-de-France
- Coordinates: 49°57′42″N 3°14′12″E
- Country: France
- Region: Hauts-de-France
- Department: Aisne
- Arrondissement: Saint-Quentin
- Canton: Bohain-en-Vermandois
- Intercommunality: Pays du Vermandois

Government
  - Mayor (2026–32): Nathalie Taniere
- Area^{1}: 9.77 km^{2} (3.77 sq mi)
- Elevation: 132 m (433 ft)
- Highest elevation: 194 m (636 ft)
- Lowest elevation: 94 m (308 ft)
- Population (2023): 560
  - Density: 57/km^{2} (150/sq mi)
- Time zone: UTC+01:00 (CET)
  - Summer (DST): UTC+02:00 (CEST)
- INSEE/Postal code: 02065 /02420
- ^{1} French Land Register data, which excludes lakes, ponds, glaciers > 1 km^{2} (0.386 sq mi or 247 acres) and river estuaries.

Bellicourt (French pronunciation: [bɛlikuʁ]) is a commune in the department of Aisne in Hauts-de-France in northern France. It lies on the N44 road between Cambrai and Saint-Quentin and over the principal tunnel of the St. Quentin Canal. It was the site of numerous intense combat actions and battles during World War I.

== Population ==
Historical population
Year	Pop.	±% p.a.
1968	624	—
1975	607	−0.39%
1982	640	+0.76%
1990	664	+0.46%
1999	680	+0.26%
2007	644	−0.68%
2012	632	−0.38%
2017	602	−0.97%
2023	560	−1.20%
Source: INSEE

== See also ==
- Communes of the Aisne department
