= Canton of Bohain-en-Vermandois =

Coordinates: 49°58′N 3°27′E

Bohain-en-Vermandois
- Canton
- Interactive map of Bohain-en-Vermandois
- Country: France
- Region: Hauts-de-France
- Department: Aisne
- No. of communes: {{{nbcomm}}}
- Area: 286.85 km^{2} (110.75 sq mi)
- Population (2023): 21,583
  - Density: 75.241/km^{2} (194.87/sq mi)
- INSEE code: 02 01

The canton of Bohain-en-Vermandois is an administrative division in northern France. At the French canton reorganisation which came into effect in March 2015, the canton was expanded from 13 to 31 communes:

1. Aubencheul-aux-Bois
2. Beaurevoir
3. Becquigny
4. Bellenglise
5. Bellicourt
6. Bohain-en-Vermandois
7. Bony
8. Brancourt-le-Grand
9. Le Catelet
10. Croix-Fonsomme
11. Estrées
12. Étaves-et-Bocquiaux
13. Fontaine-Uterte
14. Fresnoy-le-Grand
15. Gouy
16. Hargicourt
17. Lehaucourt
18. Joncourt
19. Lempire
20. Levergies
21. Magny-la-Fosse
22. Montbrehain
23. Montigny-en-Arrouaise
24. Nauroy
25. Prémont
26. Ramicourt
27. Seboncourt
28. Sequehart
29. Serain
30. Vendhuile
31. Villeret

== Demographics ==
Historical population
Year	Pop.	±% p.a.
2013	22,672	—
2018	22,066	−0.54%
Source: INSEE

== See also ==
- Cantons of the Aisne department
- Communes of France
