= Bellenglise =

- Commune
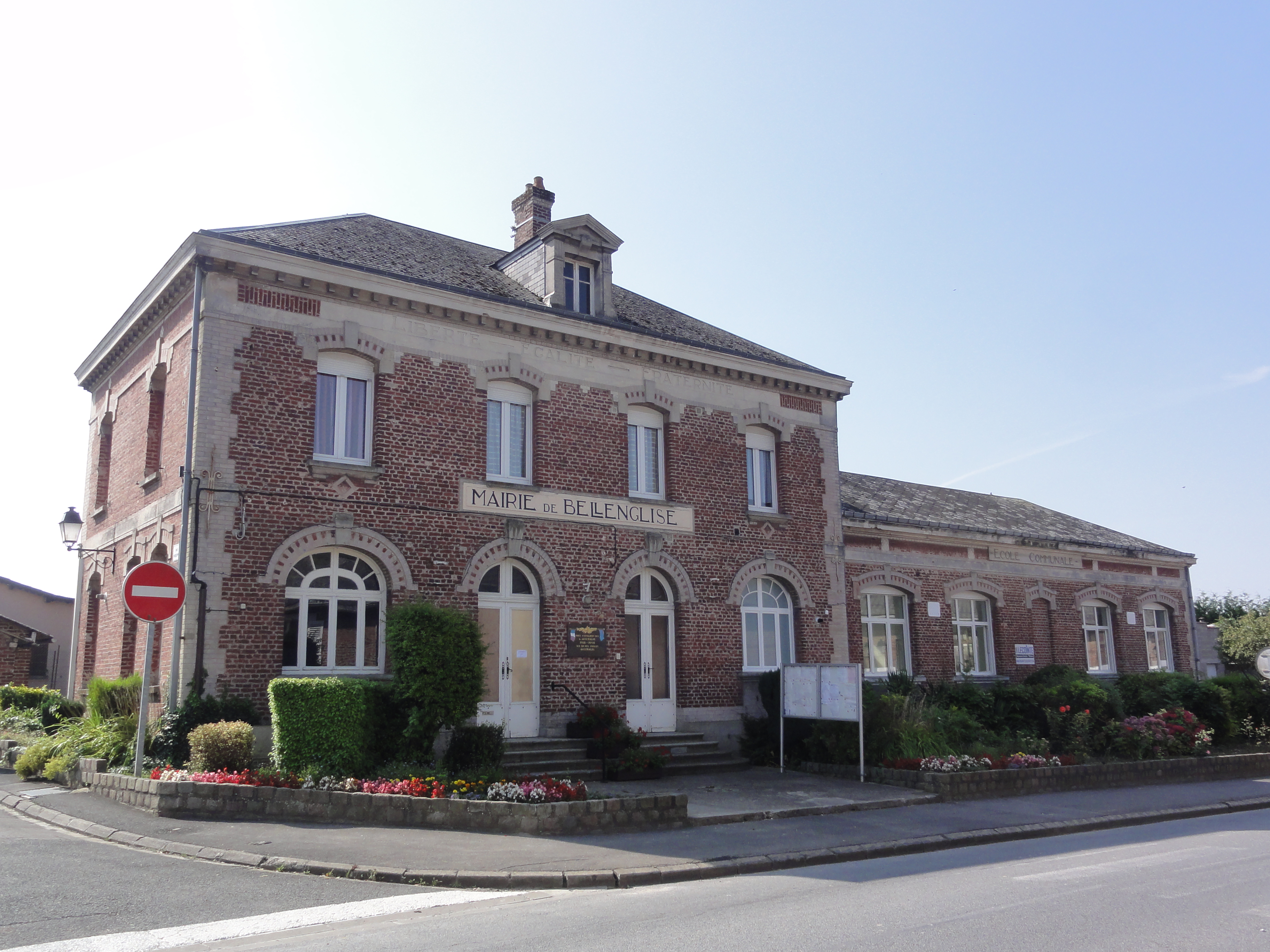
- Town hall and school
- Location of Bellenglise
- Location within France Location within Hauts-de-France
- Coordinates: 49°55′21″N 3°14′39″E
- Country: France
- Region: Hauts-de-France
- Department: Aisne
- Arrondissement: Saint-Quentin
- Canton: Bohain-en-Vermandois
- Intercommunality: Pays du Vermandois

Government
  - Mayor (2026–32): Cyril Beausir
- Area^{1}: 6.4 km^{2} (2.5 sq mi)
- Elevation: 88 m (289 ft)
- Highest elevation: 129 m (423 ft)
- Lowest elevation: 77 m (253 ft)
- Population (2023): 378
  - Density: 59/km^{2} (150/sq mi)
- Time zone: UTC+01:00 (CET)
  - Summer (DST): UTC+02:00 (CEST)
- INSEE/Postal code: 02063 /02420
- ^{1} French Land Register data, which excludes lakes, ponds, glaciers > 1 km^{2} (0.386 sq mi or 247 acres) and river estuaries.

Bellenglise (French pronunciation: [bɛlɑ̃ɡliz]) is a commune in the department of Aisne in Hauts-de-France in northern France.

== Geography ==
The village lies close to the N44, in a loop of the St. Quentin Canal, nine kilometres north of St. Quentin.

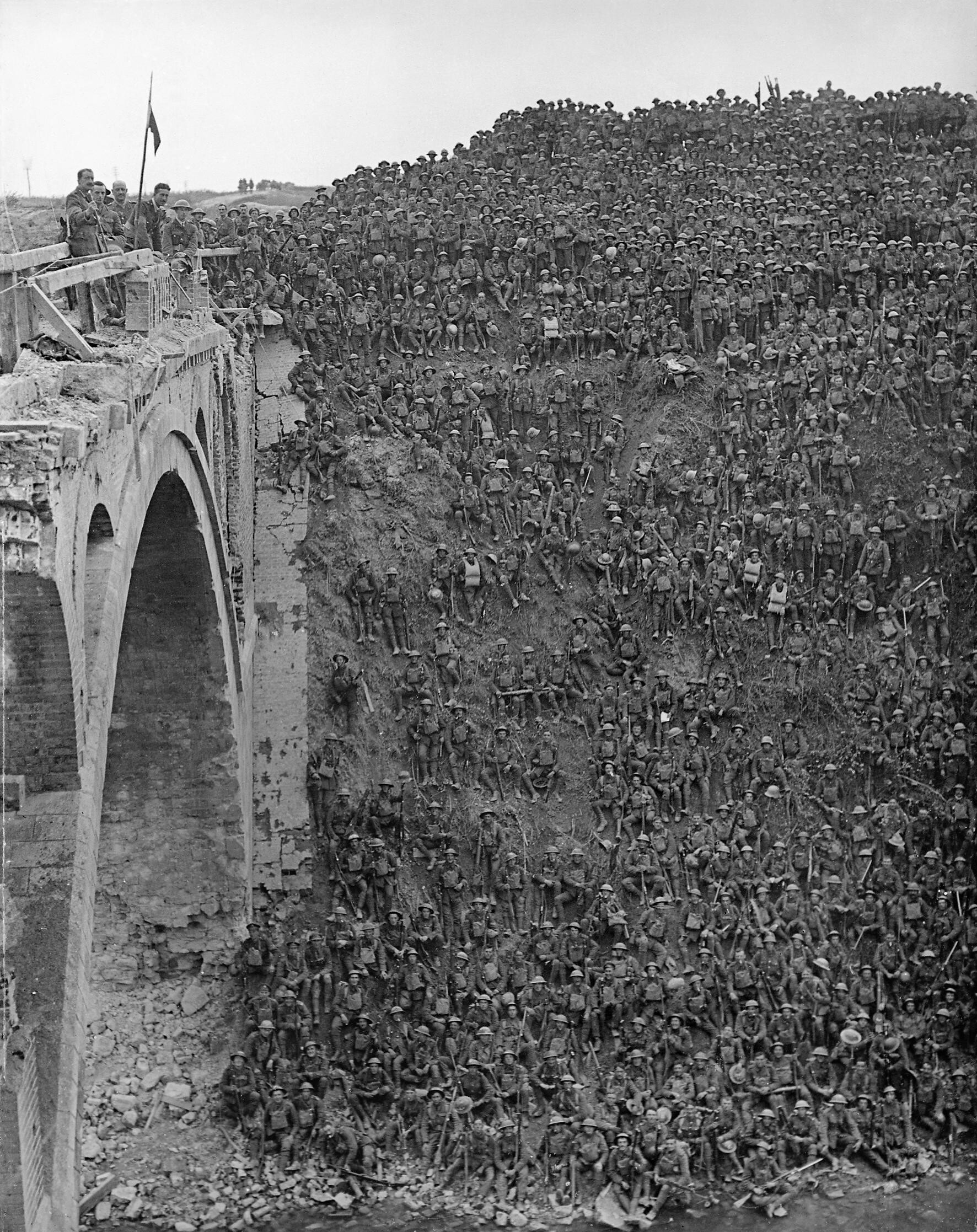
Brigadier General J V Campbell addressing troops of the 137th Brigade from the Riqueval Bridge over the St. Quentin Canal, 2 October 1918

== History ==
About two kilometres to the north is the Riqueval souterrain.

On the 28 August 1914 the French 10th Regiment of Territorial Infantry opposed a German invading force. The French unit was essentially from the local Département, with its depot in St Quentin. Despite a fierce defence, the French line gave and a battalion (1000 men) of the unit was taken prisoner.

The famous picture of the British 137th Brigade, gathered on the canal bank at Riqueval Bridge, for a pep talk after the crossing of the St. Quentin Canal, was taken nearby.

== Population ==
Historical population
Year	Pop.	±% p.a.
1968	426	—
1975	517	+2.80%
1982	479	−1.08%
1990	441	−1.03%
1999	410	−0.81%
2007	389	−0.66%
2012	383	−0.31%
2017	381	−0.10%
2023	378	−0.13%
Source: INSEE

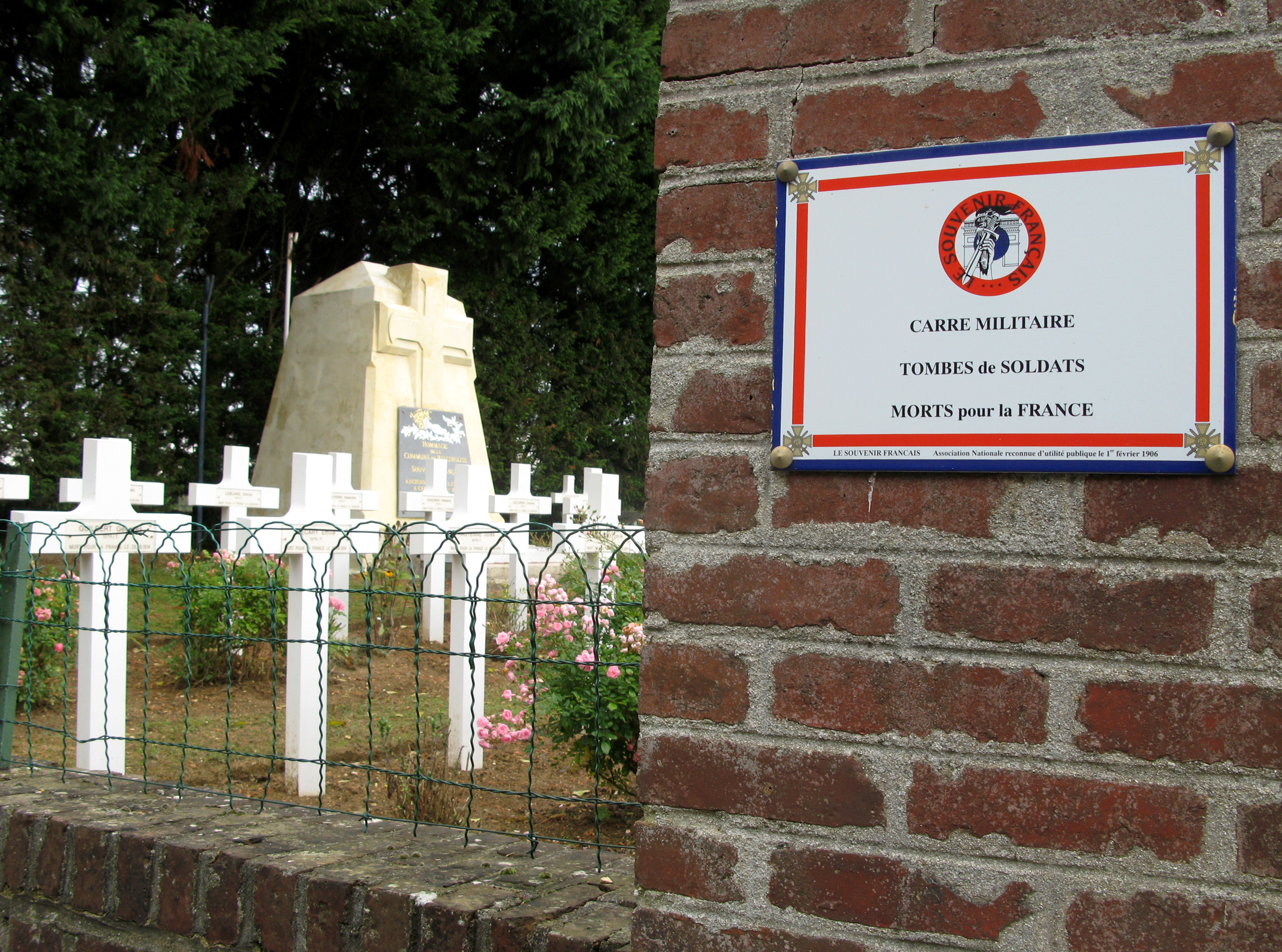
Plaque at the entrance to the cemetery. It reads 'French memory. Military Square. Graves of soldiers who died for France.'

== Sites and monuments ==
- The commune cemetery, with its military square just to the left of the entrance, where are buried soldiers who died for France.

== See also ==
- Communes of the Aisne department
