= Joncourt =

- Commune
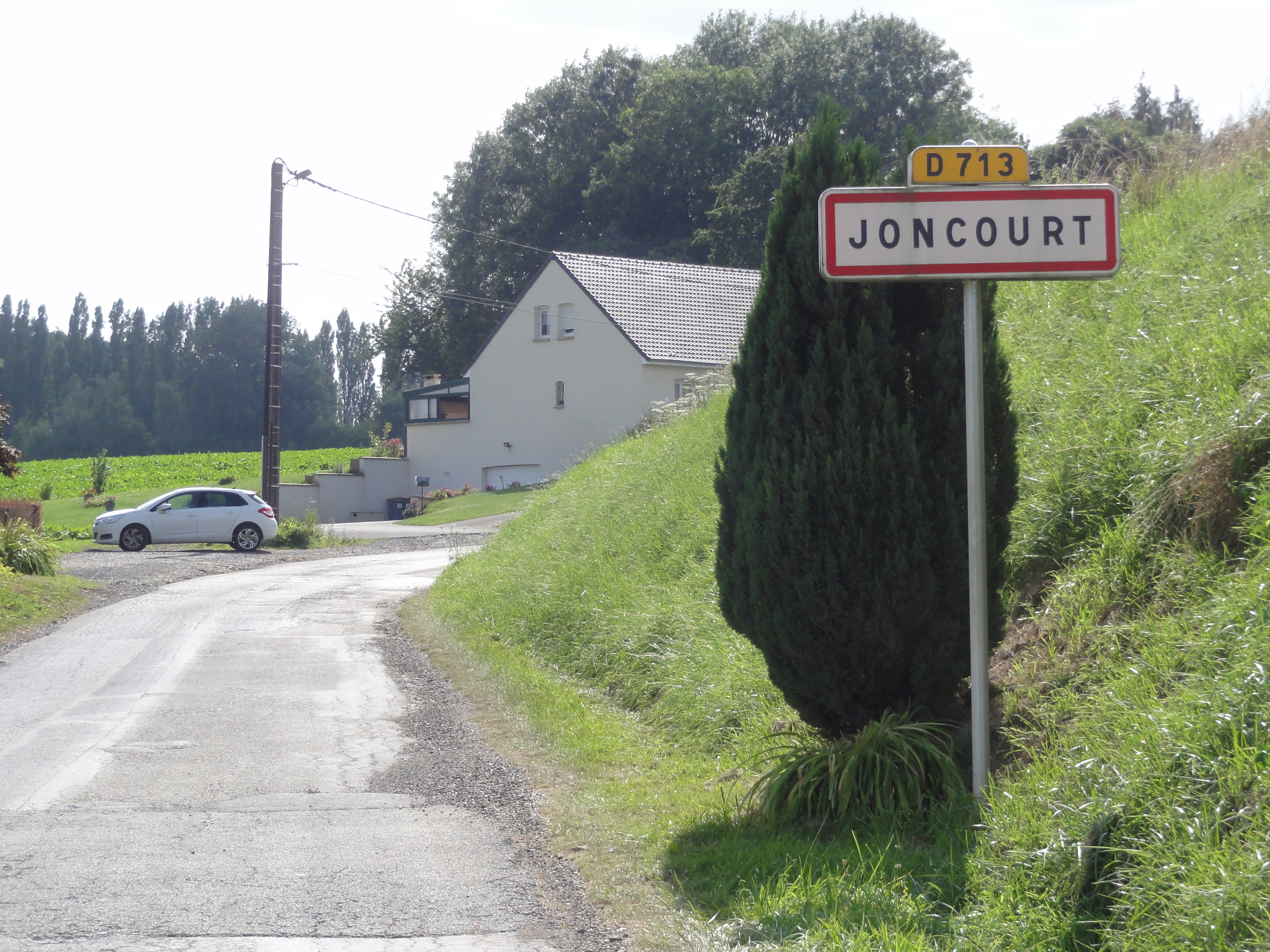
- The road into Joncourt
- Location of Joncourt
- Location within France Location within Hauts-de-France
- Coordinates: 49°57′24″N 3°18′01″E
- Country: France
- Region: Hauts-de-France
- Department: Aisne
- Arrondissement: Saint-Quentin
- Canton: Bohain-en-Vermandois

Government
  - Mayor (2026–32): Philippe Ricour
- Area^{1}: 7.25 km^{2} (2.80 sq mi)
- Elevation: 145 m (476 ft)
- Highest elevation: 153 m (502 ft)
- Lowest elevation: 108 m (354 ft)
- Population (2023): 328
  - Density: 45.2/km^{2} (117/sq mi)
- Time zone: UTC+01:00 (CET)
  - Summer (DST): UTC+02:00 (CEST)
- INSEE/Postal code: 02392 /02420
- ^{1} French Land Register data, which excludes lakes, ponds, glaciers > 1 km^{2} (0.386 sq mi or 247 acres) and river estuaries.

Joncourt (French pronunciation: [ʒɔ̃kuʁ]) is a commune in the Aisne department in Hauts-de-France in northern France.

It lies near the St. Quentin Canal.

== History ==
On 1 October 1918 during World War I, a battle was fought there that was described by the Allied media at that time as "the Miracle of the War", the 46th (North Midland) Division broke through the Hindenburg Line near the town at the canal. For his courage and leadership in the Joncourt action, the poet Wilfred Owen was posthumously awarded the Military Cross.

== Population ==
Historical population
Year	Pop.	±% p.a.
1968	278	—
1975	250	−1.51%
1982	259	+0.51%
1990	302	+1.94%
1999	332	+1.06%
2007	328	−0.15%
2012	317	−0.68%
2017	299	−1.16%
2023	328	+1.55%
Source: INSEE

== See also ==
- Communes of the Aisne department
