= Becquigny, Aisne =

Becquigny
- Commune
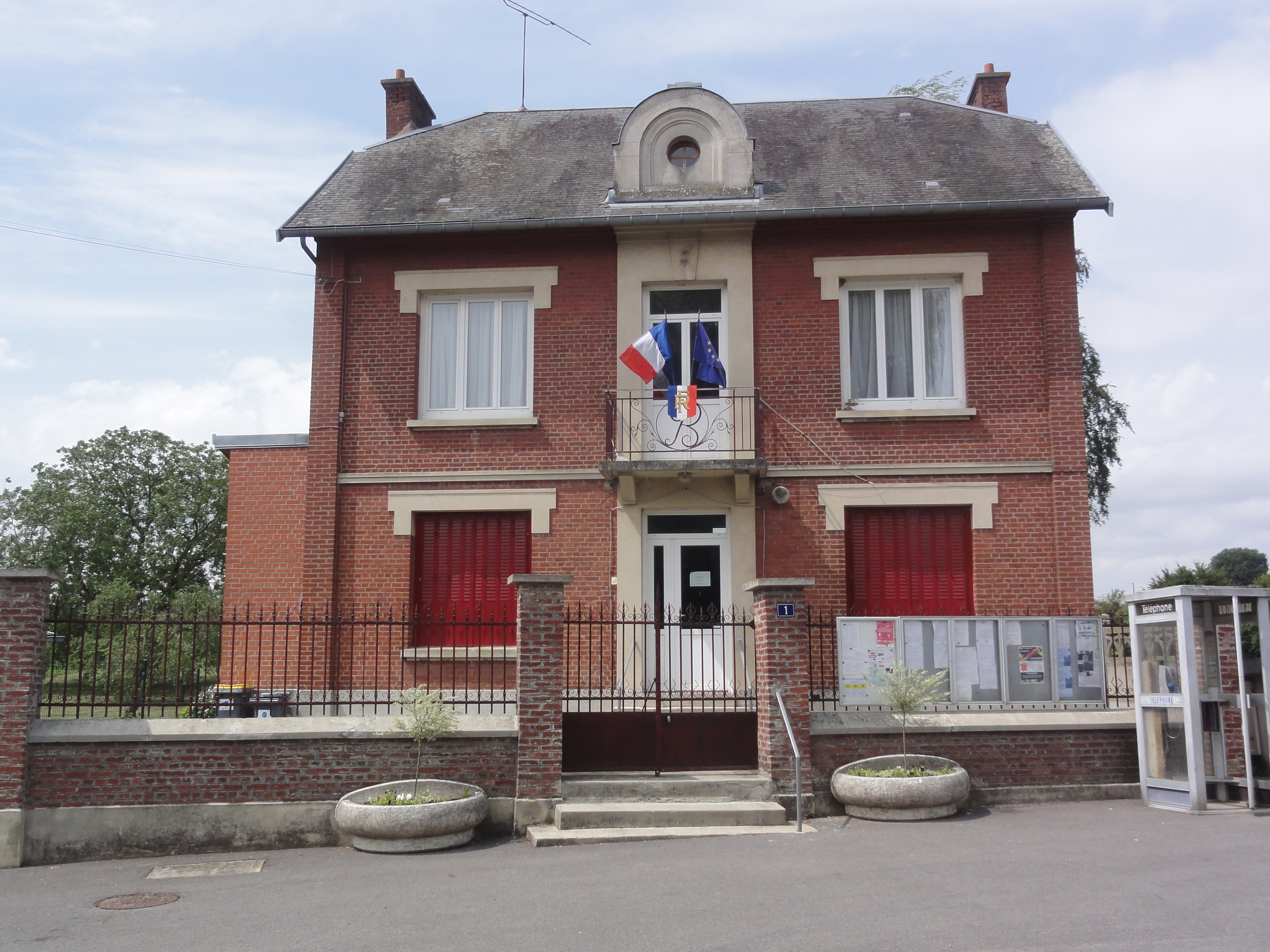
- Town hall
- Location of Becquigny
- Location within France Location within Hauts-de-France
- Coordinates: 50°01′03″N 3°28′14″E
- Country: France
- Region: Hauts-de-France
- Department: Aisne
- Arrondissement: Saint-Quentin
- Canton: Bohain-en-Vermandois
- Intercommunality: Pays du Vermandois

Government
  - Mayor (2026–32): Pierre Morel
- Area^{1}: 4.67 km^{2} (1.80 sq mi)
- Elevation: 161 m (528 ft)
- Highest elevation: 166 m (545 ft)
- Lowest elevation: 135 m (443 ft)
- Population (2023): 268
  - Density: 57.4/km^{2} (149/sq mi)
- Time zone: UTC+01:00 (CET)
  - Summer (DST): UTC+02:00 (CEST)
- INSEE/Postal code: 02061 /02110
- ^{1} French Land Register data, which excludes lakes, ponds, glaciers > 1 km^{2} (0.386 sq mi or 247 acres) and river estuaries.

Becquigny (French pronunciation: [bɛkiɲi]) is a commune in the department of Aisne in Hauts-de-France in northern France.

== Population ==
Historical population
Year	Pop.	±% p.a.
1968	301	—
1975	253	−2.45%
1982	265	+0.66%
1990	253	−0.58%
1999	274	+0.89%
2007	280	+0.27%
2012	281	+0.07%
2017	250	−2.31%
2023	268	+1.17%
Source: INSEE

== See also ==
- Communes of the Aisne department
