= Villeret, Aisne =

Villeret
- Commune
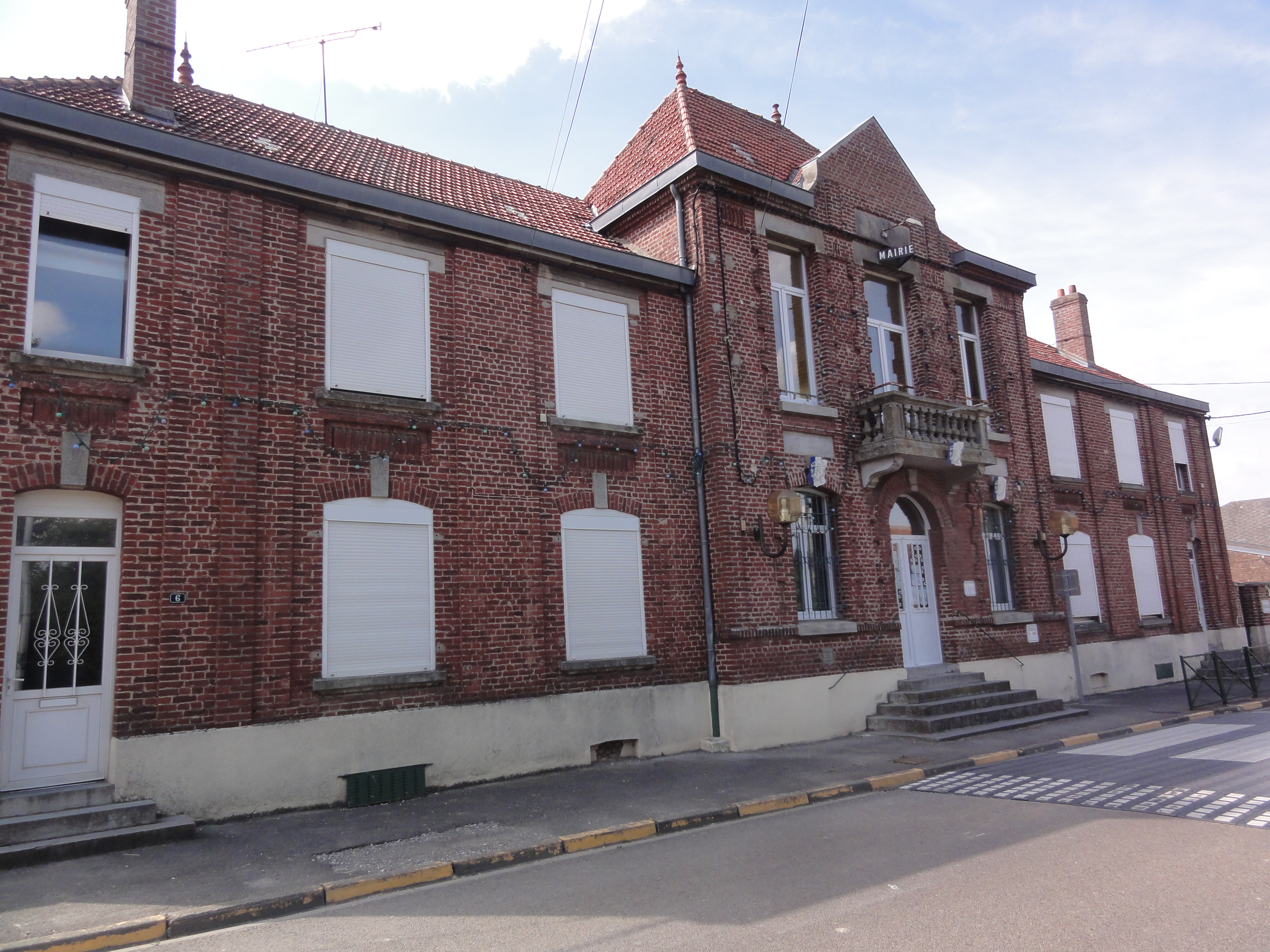
- The town hall of Villeret
- Location of Villeret
- Location within France Location within Hauts-de-France
- Coordinates: 49°57′11″N 3°11′38″E
- Country: France
- Region: Hauts-de-France
- Department: Aisne
- Arrondissement: Saint-Quentin
- Canton: Bohain-en-Vermandois
- Intercommunality: Pays du Vermandois

Government
  - Mayor (2026–32): Christophe Moreau
- Area^{1}: 3.95 km^{2} (1.53 sq mi)
- Elevation: 138 m (453 ft)
- Highest elevation: 147 m (482 ft)
- Lowest elevation: 97 m (318 ft)
- Population (2023): 263
  - Density: 66.6/km^{2} (172/sq mi)
- Time zone: UTC+01:00 (CET)
  - Summer (DST): UTC+02:00 (CEST)
- INSEE/Postal code: 02808 /02420
- ^{1} French Land Register data, which excludes lakes, ponds, glaciers > 1 km^{2} (0.386 sq mi or 247 acres) and river estuaries.

Villeret (French pronunciation: [vilʁɛ]) is a commune in the Aisne department in Hauts-de-France in northern France.

== Population ==
Historical population
Year	Pop.	±% p.a.
1968	390	—
1975	323	−2.66%
1982	291	−1.48%
1990	293	+0.09%
1999	311	+0.66%
2007	313	+0.08%
2012	312	−0.06%
2017	300	−0.78%
2023	263	−2.17%
Source: INSEE

== History ==
During the first World War, Villeret was under German occupation. Citizens of Villeret secretly sheltered a group of British soldiers who had become detached from their units in September 1914. Four of the men were discovered by the Germans and executed in 1916. This story was the subject of the 2011 book "The Englishman's Daughter / A True Story of Love and Betrayal in World War I" by Ben Macintyre. The early chapters of the book contain information on the history of Villeret.

== See also ==
- Communes of the Aisne department
