= Montigny-en-Arrouaise =

- Commune
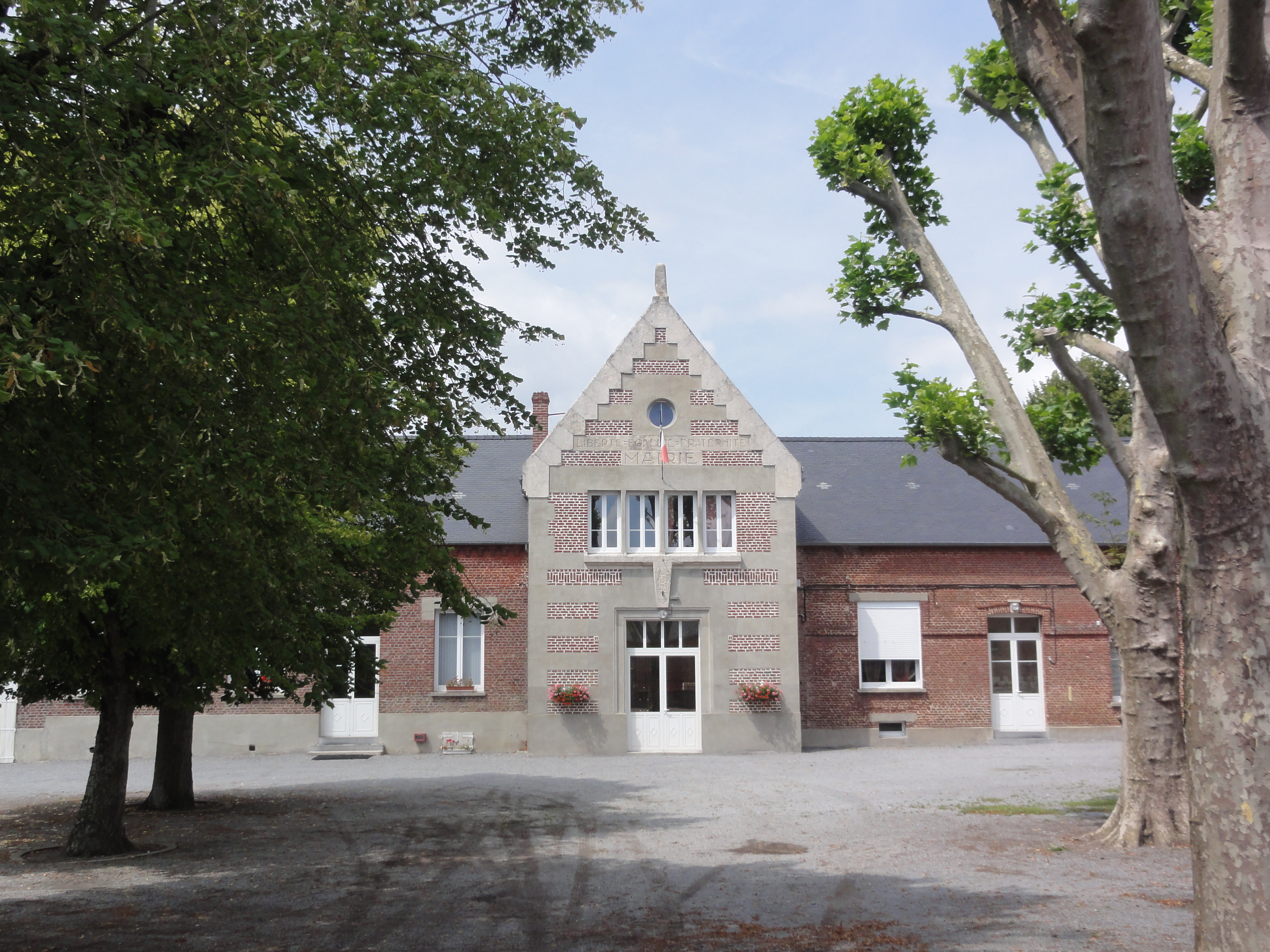
- The town hall of Montigny-en-Arrouaise
- Location of Montigny-en-Arrouaise
- Location within France Location within Hauts-de-France
- Coordinates: 49°54′24″N 3°28′37″E
- Country: France
- Region: Hauts-de-France
- Department: Aisne
- Arrondissement: Saint-Quentin
- Canton: Bohain-en-Vermandois
- Intercommunality: Pays du Vermandois

Government
  - Mayor (2026–32): Christophe Parent
- Area^{1}: 9.77 km^{2} (3.77 sq mi)
- Highest elevation: 154 m (505 ft)
- Lowest elevation: 90 m (300 ft)
- Population (2023): 317
  - Density: 32.4/km^{2} (84.0/sq mi)
- Time zone: UTC+01:00 (CET)
  - Summer (DST): UTC+02:00 (CEST)
- INSEE/Postal code: 02511 /02110
- ^{1} French Land Register data, which excludes lakes, ponds, glaciers > 1 km^{2} (0.386 sq mi or 247 acres) and river estuaries.

Montigny-en-Arrouaise is a commune in the Aisne department in Hauts-de-France in northern France.

== Population ==
Historical population
Year	Pop.	±% p.a.
1968	303	—
1975	316	+0.60%
1982	296	−0.93%
1990	300	+0.17%
1999	274	−1.00%
2007	288	+0.62%
2012	306	+1.22%
2017	291	−1.00%
2023	317	+1.44%
Source: INSEE

== See also ==
- Communes of the Aisne department
