= Lehaucourt =

- Commune
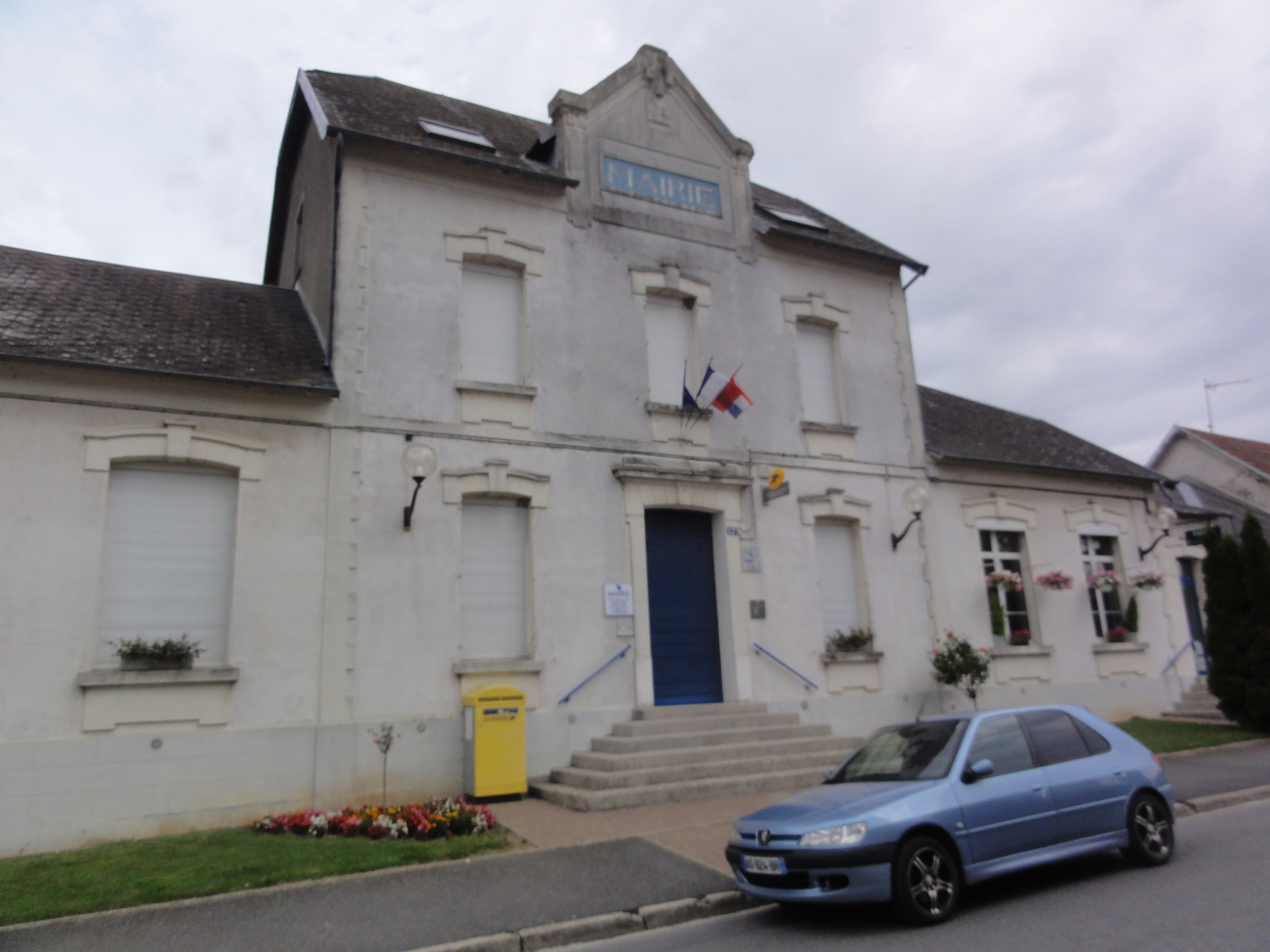
- The town hall of Lehaucourt
- Location of Lehaucourt
- Location within France Location within Hauts-de-France
- Coordinates: 49°55′14″N 3°16′50″E
- Country: France
- Region: Hauts-de-France
- Department: Aisne
- Arrondissement: Saint-Quentin
- Canton: Bohain-en-Vermandois
- Intercommunality: Pays du Vermandois

Government
  - Mayor (2026–32): Michel Pinçon
- Area^{1}: 9.37 km^{2} (3.62 sq mi)
- Elevation: 87 m (285 ft)
- Population (2023): 822
  - Density: 87.7/km^{2} (227/sq mi)
- Demonym: Haucourtois
- Time zone: UTC+01:00 (CET)
  - Summer (DST): UTC+02:00 (CEST)
- INSEE/Postal code: 02374 /02420
- ^{1} French Land Register data, which excludes lakes, ponds, glaciers > 1 km^{2} (0.386 sq mi or 247 acres) and river estuaries.

Lehaucourt (French pronunciation: [ləokuʁ], before 1998: Le Haucourt) is a commune in the Aisne department in Hauts-de-France in northern France.

== Population ==
Historical population
Year	Pop.	±% p.a.
1968	428	—
1975	760	+8.55%
1982	764	+0.08%
1990	803	+0.62%
1999	832	+0.39%
2007	761	−1.11%
2012	930	+4.09%
2017	877	−1.17%
2023	822	−1.07%
Source: INSEE

== See also ==
- Communes of the Aisne department
