= Sequehart =

- Commune
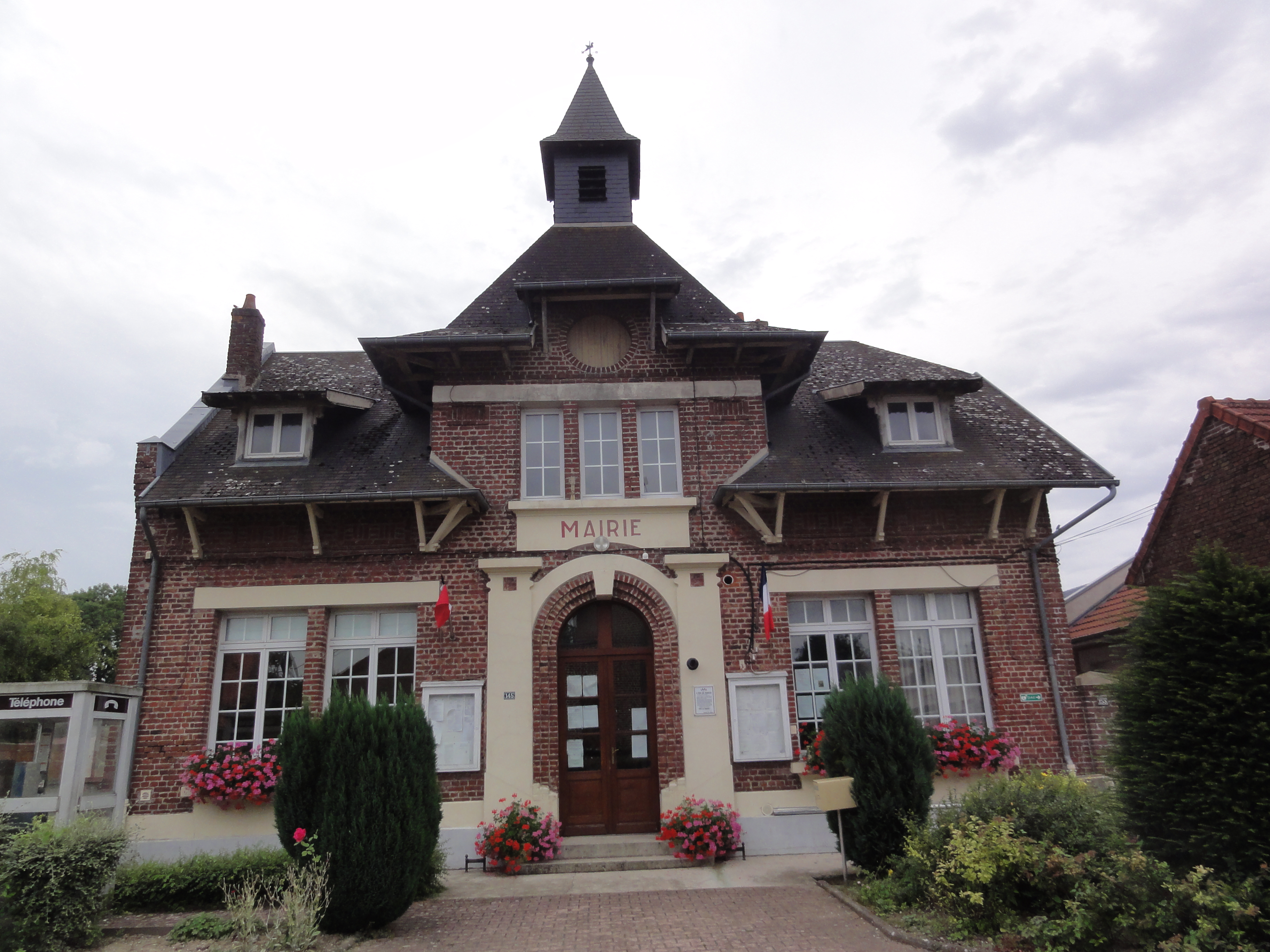
- The town hall of Sequehart

- Coat of arms
- Location of Sequehart
- Location within France Location within Hauts-de-France
- Coordinates: 49°55′48″N 3°20′01″E
- Country: France
- Region: Hauts-de-France
- Department: Aisne
- Arrondissement: Saint-Quentin
- Canton: Bohain-en-Vermandois
- Intercommunality: Pays du Vermandois

Government
  - Mayor (2026–32): Philippe Rémy
- Area^{1}: 6.38 km^{2} (2.46 sq mi)
- Elevation: 115 m (377 ft)
- Highest elevation: 151 m (495 ft)
- Lowest elevation: 95 m (312 ft)
- Population (2023): 219
  - Density: 34.3/km^{2} (88.9/sq mi)
- Time zone: UTC+01:00 (CET)
  - Summer (DST): UTC+02:00 (CEST)
- INSEE/Postal code: 02708 /02420
- ^{1} French Land Register data, which excludes lakes, ponds, glaciers > 1 km^{2} (0.386 sq mi or 247 acres) and river estuaries.

Sequehart is a commune in the Aisne department in Hauts-de-France in northern France.

== Population ==
Historical population
Year	Pop.	±% p.a.
1968	218	—
1975	189	−2.02%
1982	235	+3.16%
1990	233	−0.11%
1999	217	−0.79%
2007	226	+0.51%
2012	221	−0.45%
2017	209	−1.11%
2023	219	+0.78%
Source: INSEE

== See also ==
- Communes of the Aisne department
