= Levergies =

- Commune
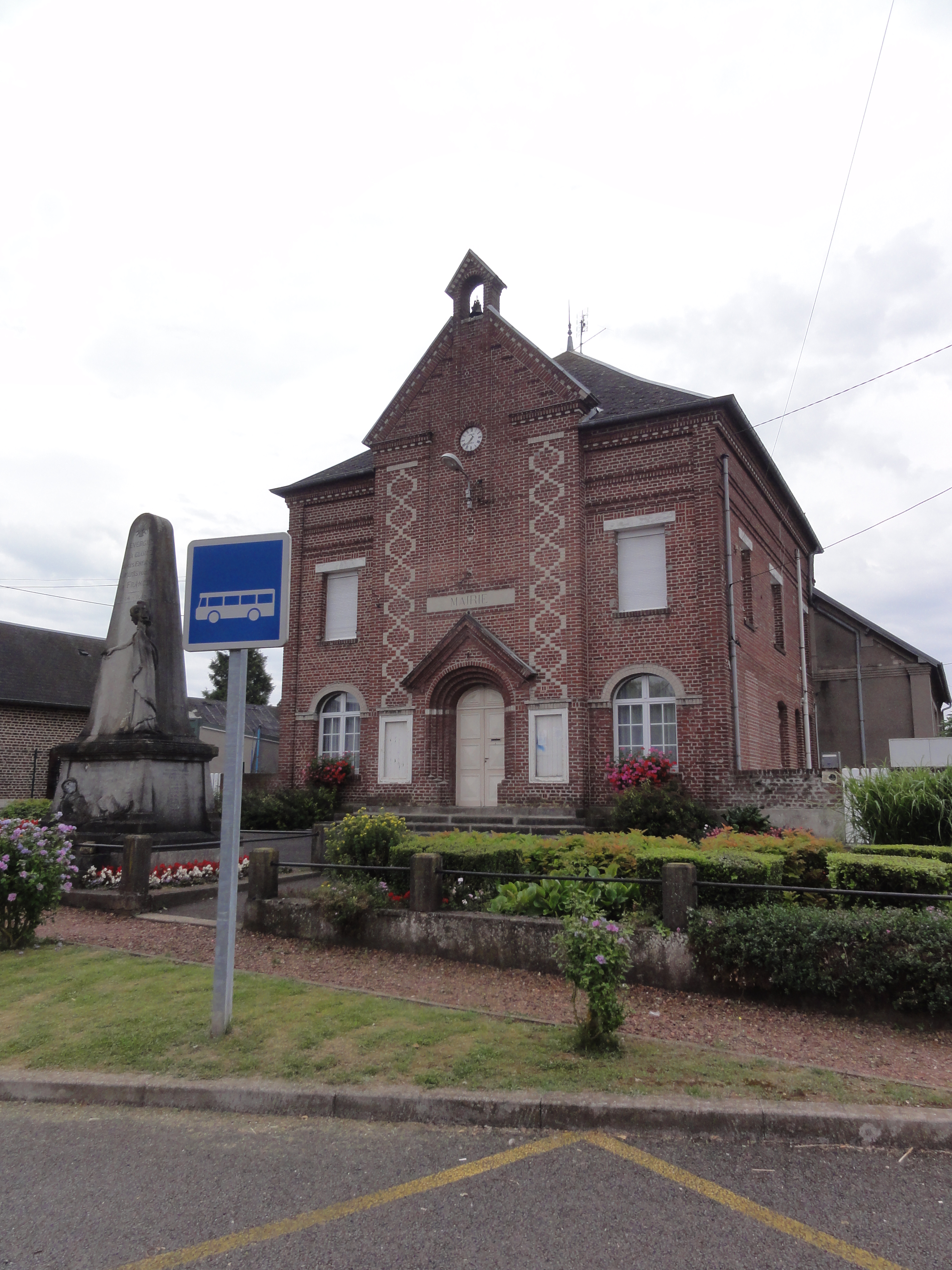
- The town hall of Levergies
- Location of Levergies
- Location within France Location within Hauts-de-France
- Coordinates: 49°55′40″N 3°18′48″E
- Country: France
- Region: Hauts-de-France
- Department: Aisne
- Arrondissement: Saint-Quentin
- Canton: Bohain-en-Vermandois
- Intercommunality: Pays du Vermandois

Government
  - Mayor (2026–32): Bernard Nuttens
- Area^{1}: 7.67 km^{2} (2.96 sq mi)
- Elevation: 115 m (377 ft)
- Highest elevation: 155 m (509 ft)
- Lowest elevation: 94 m (308 ft)
- Population (2023): 543
  - Density: 70.8/km^{2} (183/sq mi)
- Time zone: UTC+01:00 (CET)
  - Summer (DST): UTC+02:00 (CEST)
- INSEE/Postal code: 02426 /02420
- ^{1} French Land Register data, which excludes lakes, ponds, glaciers > 1 km^{2} (0.386 sq mi or 247 acres) and river estuaries.

Levergies (French pronunciation: [ləvɛʁʒi]) is a commune in the Aisne department in Hauts-de-France in northern France.

== Population ==
Historical population
Year	Pop.	±% p.a.
1968	512	—
1975	536	+0.66%
1982	566	+0.78%
1990	601	+0.75%
1999	577	−0.45%
2007	600	+0.49%
2012	575	−0.85%
2017	545	−1.07%
2023	543	−0.06%
Source: INSEE

== See also ==
- Communes of the Aisne department
