= Étaves-et-Bocquiaux =

- Commune
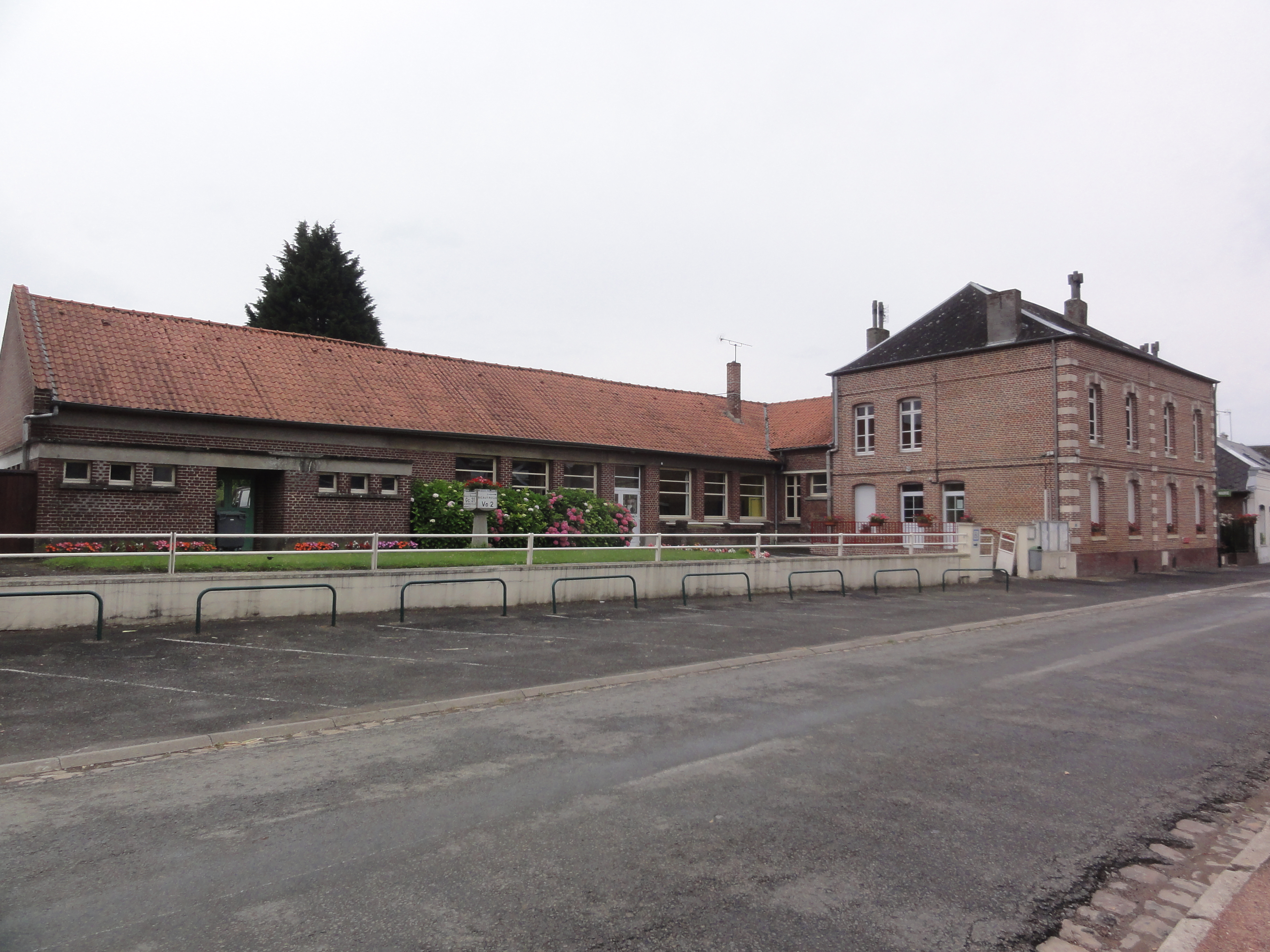
- The town hall and school of Étaves-et-Bocquiaux
- Location of Étaves-et-Bocquiaux
- Location within France Location within Hauts-de-France
- Coordinates: 49°56′22″N 3°27′17″E
- Country: France
- Region: Hauts-de-France
- Department: Aisne
- Arrondissement: Saint-Quentin
- Canton: Bohain-en-Vermandois
- Intercommunality: Pays du Vermandois

Government
  - Mayor (2026–32): Philippe Cunot
- Area^{1}: 13.69 km^{2} (5.29 sq mi)
- Elevation: 140 m (460 ft)
- Highest elevation: 160 m (520 ft)
- Lowest elevation: 92 m (302 ft)
- Population (2023): 543
  - Density: 39.7/km^{2} (103/sq mi)
- Time zone: UTC+01:00 (CET)
  - Summer (DST): UTC+02:00 (CEST)
- INSEE/Postal code: 02293 /02110
- ^{1} French Land Register data, which excludes lakes, ponds, glaciers > 1 km^{2} (0.386 sq mi or 247 acres) and river estuaries.

Étaves-et-Bocquiaux (French pronunciation: [etav e bɔkjo]) is a commune in the Aisne department in Hauts-de-France in northern France.

== Population ==
Historical population
Year	Pop.	±% p.a.
1968	700	—
1975	672	−0.58%
1982	634	−0.83%
1990	604	−0.60%
1999	584	−0.37%
2007	551	−0.72%
2012	583	+1.14%
2017	557	−0.91%
2023	543	−0.42%
Source: INSEE

== See also ==
- Communes of the Aisne department
