= Lempire =

- Commune
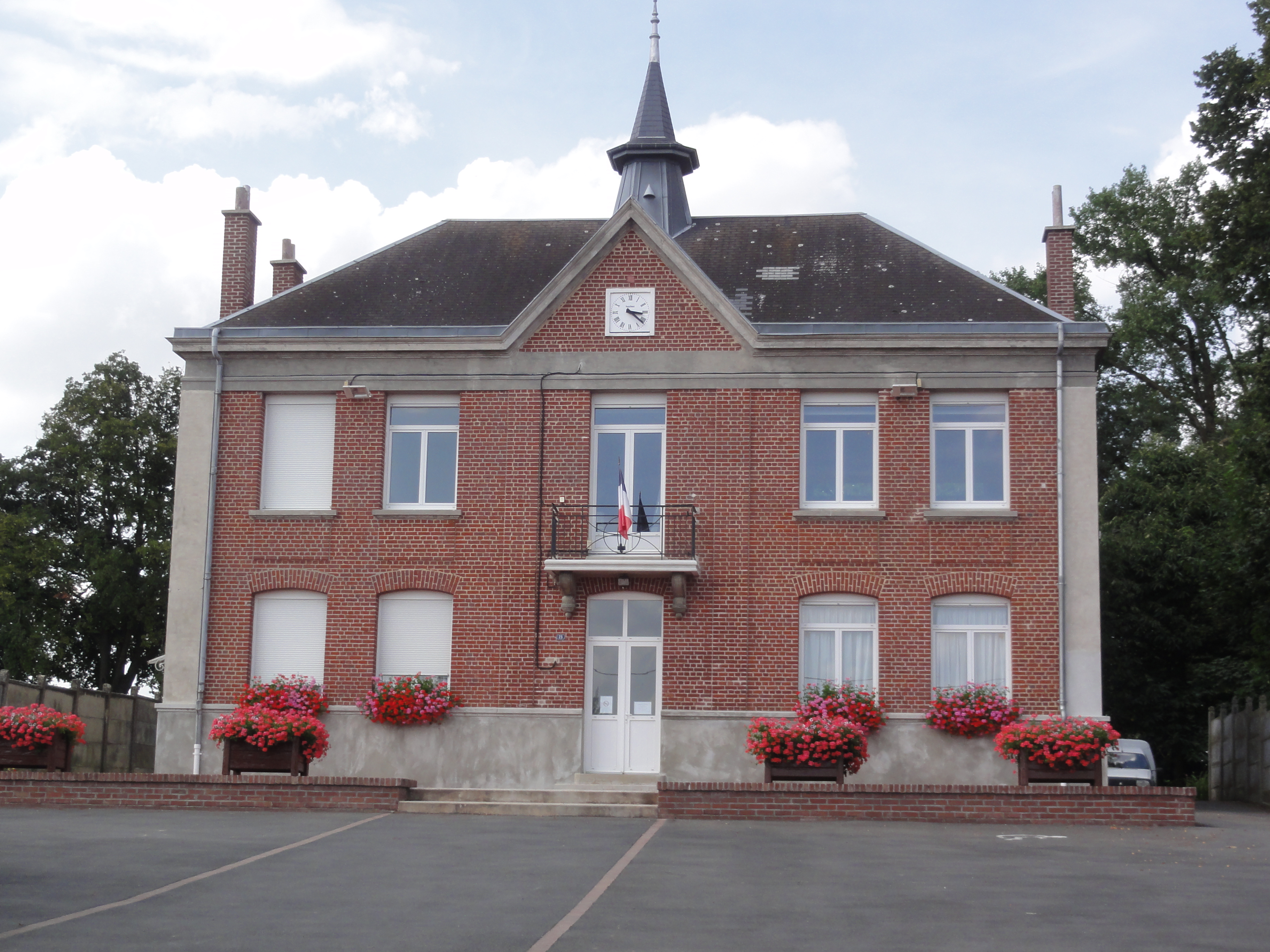
- The town hall of Lempire

- Coat of arms
- Location of Lempire
- Location within France Location within Hauts-de-France
- Coordinates: 49°59′36″N 3°10′24″E
- Country: France
- Region: Hauts-de-France
- Department: Aisne
- Arrondissement: Saint-Quentin
- Canton: Bohain-en-Vermandois
- Intercommunality: Pays du Vermandois

Government
  - Mayor (2026–32): Thierry Cornaille
- Area^{1}: 2.62 km^{2} (1.01 sq mi)
- Elevation: 134 m (440 ft)
- Highest elevation: 144 m (472 ft)
- Lowest elevation: 104 m (341 ft)
- Population (2023): 125
  - Density: 47.7/km^{2} (124/sq mi)
- Time zone: UTC+01:00 (CET)
  - Summer (DST): UTC+02:00 (CEST)
- INSEE/Postal code: 02417 /02420
- ^{1} French Land Register data, which excludes lakes, ponds, glaciers > 1 km^{2} (0.386 sq mi or 247 acres) and river estuaries.

Lempire (French pronunciation: [lɑ̃piʁ]) is a commune in the Aisne department in Hauts-de-France in northern France.

== Population ==
Historical population
Year	Pop.	±% p.a.
1968	124	—
1975	122	−0.23%
1982	113	−1.09%
1990	127	+1.47%
1999	107	−1.89%
2007	96	−1.35%
2012	104	+1.61%
2017	100	−0.78%
2023	125	+3.79%
Source: INSEE

== See also ==
- Communes of the Aisne department
