= Le Catelet =

- Commune
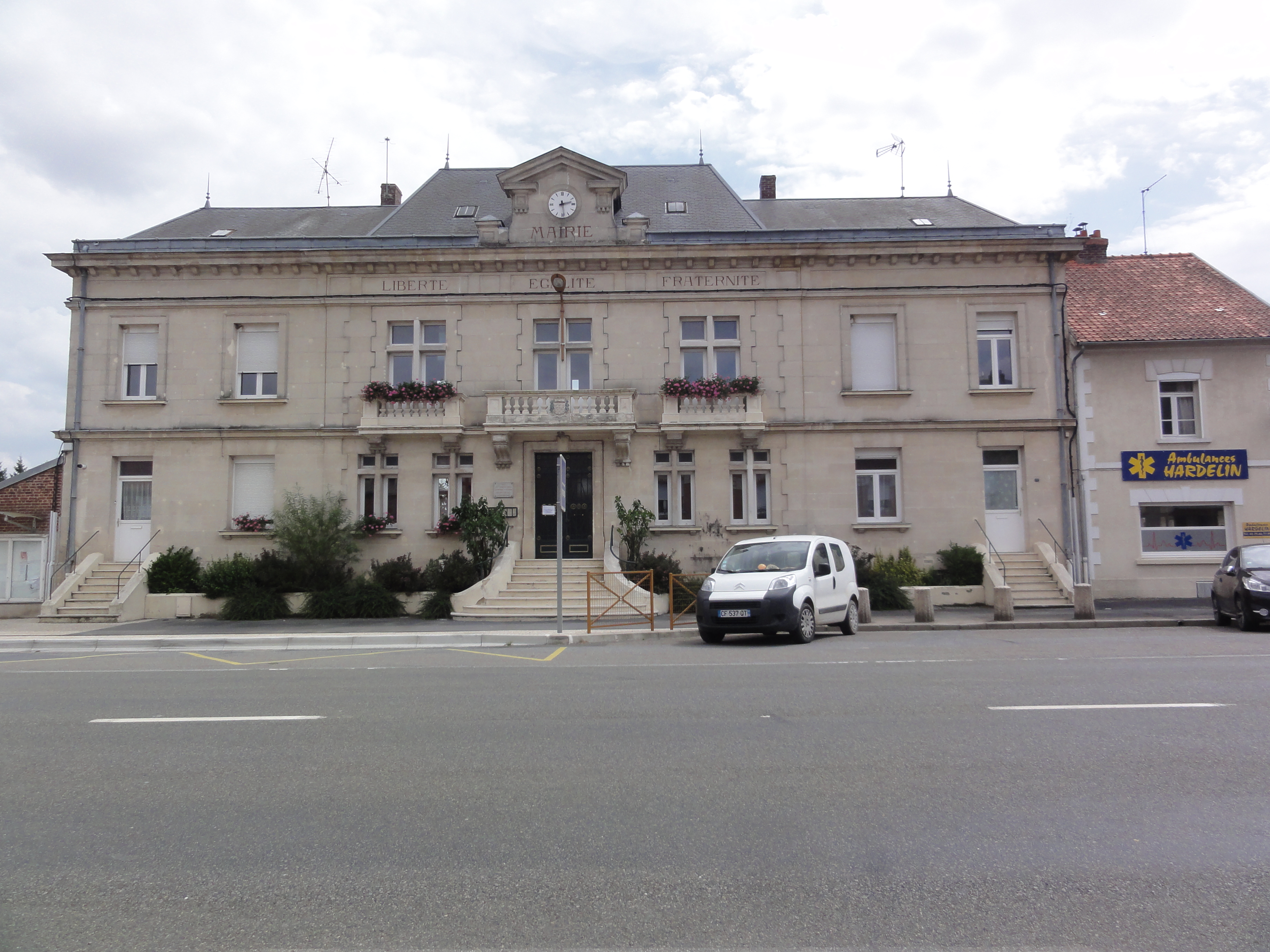
- The town hall of Le Catelet

- Coat of arms
- Location of Le Catelet
- Location within France Location within Hauts-de-France
- Coordinates: 50°00′11″N 3°14′42″E
- Country: France
- Region: Hauts-de-France
- Department: Aisne
- Arrondissement: Saint-Quentin
- Canton: Bohain-en-Vermandois
- Intercommunality: Pays du Vermandois

Government
  - Mayor (2026–32): Chrystelle Locquet-Gonelle
- Area^{1}: 0.4 km^{2} (0.15 sq mi)
- Elevation: 93 m (305 ft)
- Highest elevation: 108 m (354 ft)
- Lowest elevation: 87 m (285 ft)
- Population (2023): 186
  - Density: 470/km^{2} (1,200/sq mi)
- Time zone: UTC+01:00 (CET)
  - Summer (DST): UTC+02:00 (CEST)
- INSEE/Postal code: 02143 /02420
- ^{1} French Land Register data, which excludes lakes, ponds, glaciers > 1 km^{2} (0.386 sq mi or 247 acres) and river estuaries.

Le Catelet (French pronunciation: [lə katlɛ]) is a commune in the Aisne department in Hauts-de-France in northern France.

== Population ==
Historical population
Year	Pop.	±% p.a.
1968	243	—
1975	272	+1.62%
1982	243	−1.60%
1990	223	−1.07%
1999	218	−0.25%
2007	199	−1.13%
2012	196	−0.30%
2017	192	−0.41%
2023	186	−0.53%
Source: INSEE

== See also ==
- Communes of the Aisne department
