= Hargicourt, Aisne =

Hargicourt
- Commune
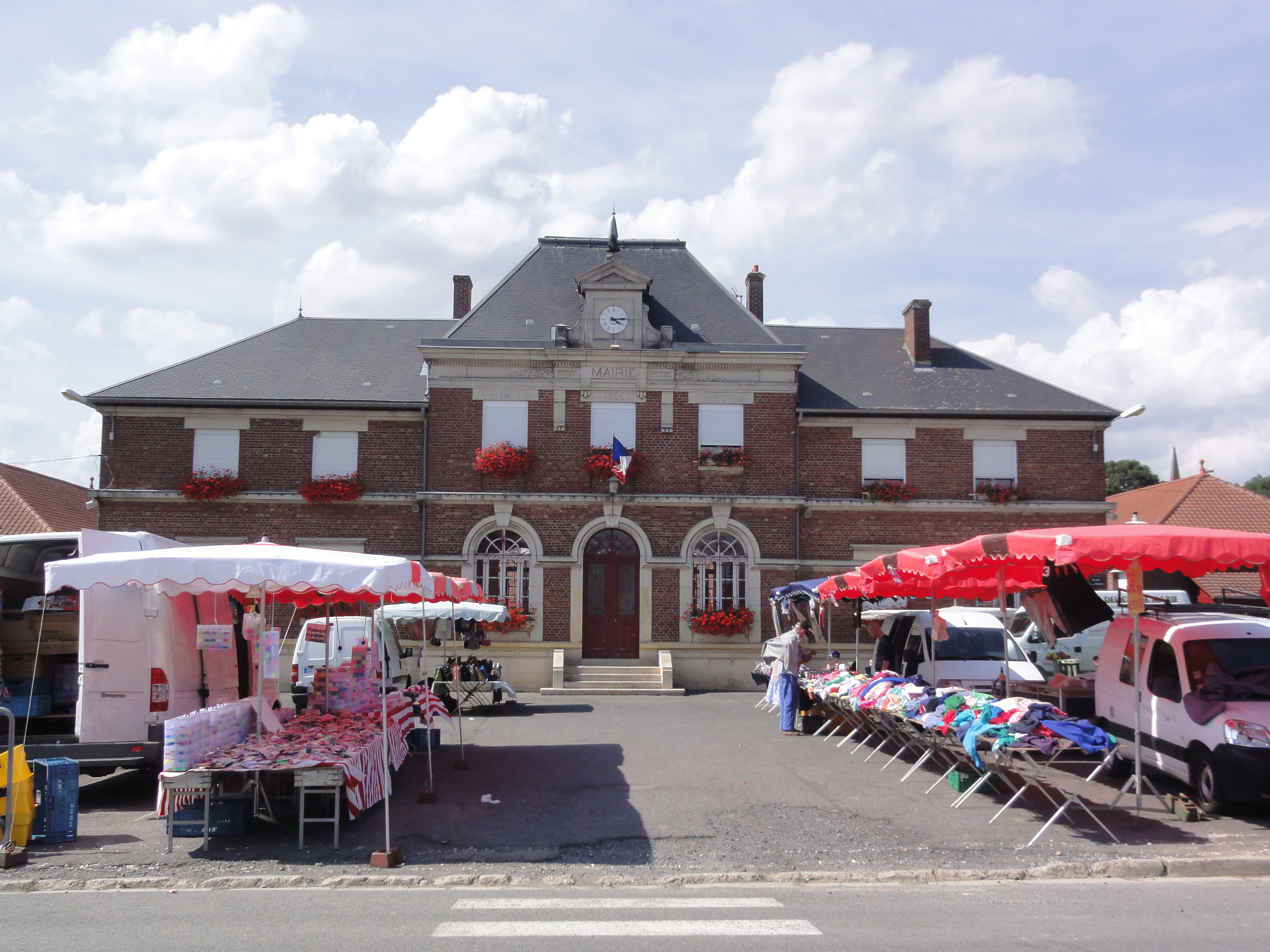
- The town hall of Hargicourt

- Coat of arms
- Location of Hargicourt
- Location within France Location within Hauts-de-France
- Coordinates: 49°57′47″N 3°10′51″E
- Country: France
- Region: Hauts-de-France
- Department: Aisne
- Arrondissement: Saint-Quentin
- Canton: Bohain-en-Vermandois
- Intercommunality: Pays du Vermandois

Government
  - Mayor (2026–32): Matthieu Destombes
- Area^{1}: 8.12 km^{2} (3.14 sq mi)
- Elevation: 140 m (460 ft)
- Highest elevation: 151 m (495 ft)
- Lowest elevation: 102 m (335 ft)
- Population (2023): 545
  - Density: 67.1/km^{2} (174/sq mi)
- Time zone: UTC+01:00 (CET)
  - Summer (DST): UTC+02:00 (CEST)
- INSEE/Postal code: 02370 /02420
- ^{1} French Land Register data, which excludes lakes, ponds, glaciers > 1 km^{2} (0.386 sq mi or 247 acres) and river estuaries.

Hargicourt is a commune in the Aisne department in Hauts-de-France in northern France.

== Population ==
Historical population
| Year | Pop. | ±% p.a. |
|---|---|---|
| 1968 | 559 | — |
| 1975 | 561 | +0.05% |
| 1982 | 540 | −0.54% |
| 1990 | 557 | +0.39% |
| 1999 | 559 | +0.04% |
| 2007 | 537 | −0.50% |
| 2012 | 570 | +1.20% |
| 2017 | 598 | +0.96% |
| 2023 | 545 | −1.53% |
Source: INSEE

== See also ==
- Communes of the Aisne department
