= Canton of Moÿ-de-l'Aisne =

Coordinates: 49°45′N 3°22′E

Moÿ-de-l'Aisne
- Former canton
- Interactive map of Moÿ-de-l'Aisne
- Country: France
- Region: Hauts-de-France
- Department: Aisne
- No. of communes: {{{nbcomm}}}
- Disbanded: 2015
- Area: 127.56 km^{2} (49.25 sq mi)
- Population (2012): 7,898
  - Density: 61.92/km^{2} (160.4/sq mi)

The canton of Moÿ-de-l'Aisne is a former administrative division in northern France. It was disbanded following the French canton reorganisation which came into effect in March 2015. It consisted of 17 communes, which joined the canton of Ribemont in 2015. It had 7,898 inhabitants in 2012.

The canton comprised the following communes:

- Alaincourt
- Benay
- Berthenicourt
- Brissay-Choigny
- Brissy-Hamégicourt
- Cerizy
- Châtillon-sur-Oise
- Essigny-le-Grand
- Gibercourt
- Hinacourt
- Itancourt
- Ly-Fontaine
- Mézières-sur-Oise
- Moÿ-de-l'Aisne
- Remigny
- Urvillers
- Vendeuil

== Demographics ==
Historical population Canton of Moÿ-de-l'Aisne
Year	1962	1968	1975	1982	1990	1999
Pop.	6,875	7,264	7,144	7,596	8,014	7,752
±%	—	+5.7%	−1.7%	+6.3%	+5.5%	−3.3%
From the year 1962 on: No double counting – residents of multiple communes (e.g. students and military personnel) are counted only once. Source: INSEE

== See also ==
- Cantons of the Aisne department
