= Brissy-Hamégicourt =

- Commune
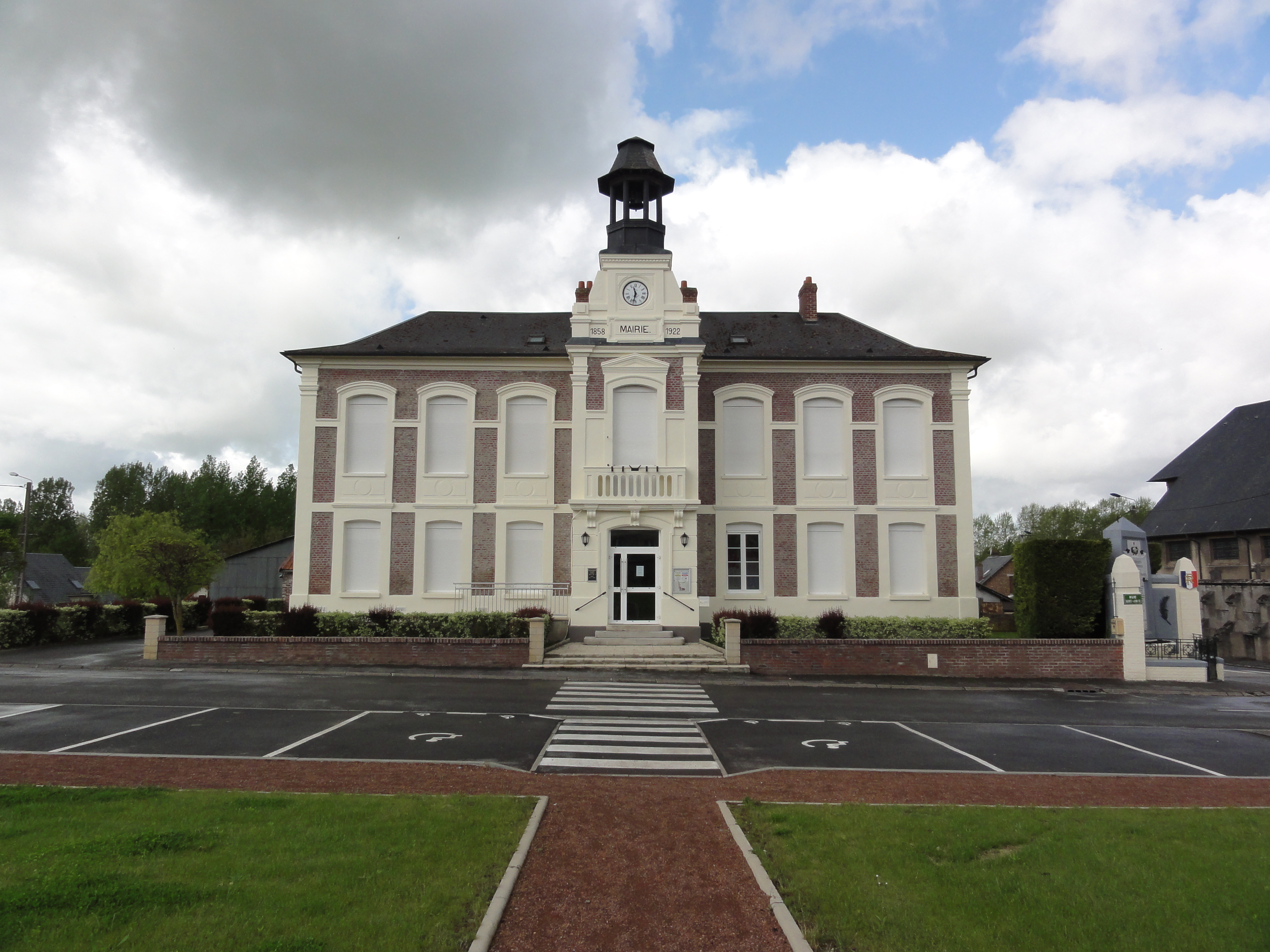
- The town hall of Brissy-Hamégicourt
- Location of Brissy-Hamégicourt
- Location within France Location within Hauts-de-France
- Coordinates: 49°44′40″N 3°22′52″E
- Country: France
- Region: Hauts-de-France
- Department: Aisne
- Arrondissement: Saint-Quentin
- Canton: Ribemont

Government
  - Mayor (2026–32): Marie-Pierre Abdouli
- Area^{1}: 12.38 km^{2} (4.78 sq mi)
- Elevation: 70 m (230 ft)
- Highest elevation: 112 m (367 ft)
- Lowest elevation: 54 m (177 ft)
- Population (2023): 653
  - Density: 52.7/km^{2} (137/sq mi)
- Time zone: UTC+01:00 (CET)
  - Summer (DST): UTC+02:00 (CEST)
- INSEE/Postal code: 02124 /02240
- ^{1} French Land Register data, which excludes lakes, ponds, glaciers > 1 km^{2} (0.386 sq mi or 247 acres) and river estuaries.

Brissy-Hamégicourt (French pronunciation: [bʁisi ameʒikuʁ]) is a commune in the department of Aisne in Hauts-de-France in northern France.

== Geography ==
Brissy-Hamégicourt is situated on the Oise and the Canal de la Sambre à l'Oise, about 13 kilometres (8 mi) south-southeast of Saint-Quentin. The A26 autoroute crosses the Oise valley within the commune. Three wind turbines are located in the northeastern part of the commune.

Brissy-Hamégicourt is bordered by the communes of Alaincourt to the northwest and north, Séry-lès-Mézières to the north and northeast, Renansart to the east and southeast, Brissay-Choigny to the south, and Moÿ-de-l'Aisne to the west.

== Population ==
Historical population
| Year | Pop. | ±% p.a. |
|---|---|---|
| 1968 | 814 | — |
| 1975 | 741 | −1.33% |
| 1982 | 726 | −0.29% |
| 1990 | 715 | −0.19% |
| 1999 | 626 | −1.47% |
| 2007 | 639 | +0.26% |
| 2012 | 640 | +0.03% |
| 2017 | 653 | +0.40% |
| 2023 | 653 | +0.00% |
Source: INSEE

== See also ==
- Communes of the Aisne department
