= Battle of the Serre =

1918 Battle of the First World War

Battle of Serre
- Part of the Western Front of the First World War
Date	20–30 October 1918
Location	France
Result	German retreat

Belligerents
France	German Empire

Commanders and leaders
(French Third Republic) Mangin (France) Debeney	(German Empire) Magnus von Eberhardt (German Empire) Oskar von Hutier

Strength
10th Army (France); 1st Army (France)	VIIe armée XVIIIe armée

The Battle of the Serre was a battle of the First World War which took place in Aisne from 20 to 30 October 1918.

== Context ==
Beginning October 1918, Foch resumed his general offensive, breaking the Hindenburg Line, forcing the German armies to take refuge behind the banks of the Selle, the Oise, the Serre, the Aisne, amidst the fortified lines of the Hermann Stellung, Hunding Stellung, Brunhilde Stellung and Kriemhilde Stellung.

On the Chavignon-Laon axis, Mangin (10th Army) dislodged the Germans from the Saint-Gobain forest massif and on 13 October entered Laon. On the 19th, it is located on the edge of the Hunding Stellung.

In a position that dominated the Mont d'Origny bridgehead and the Renansart plateau, Debeney (1st Army) faces a slip road of the Hermann Stellung between Origny and Mesbrecourt.

== Opposing Forces ==
=== France ===
- 10th Army (France)
  - 16th Army Corps (France), 18th Army Corps (France), 35th Army Corps (France)
- 1st Army (France)
  - 8e corps d'armée (France), 20e corps d'armée (France), 31st Army Corps (France)

=== German Empire ===
- 7th Army (German Empire)
- 18th Army (German Empire)

== Course of the battle ==
=== Mangin in front of the Serre marshes ===
Between Debeney (1st Army) and Guillaumat (5th Army), Mangin and his 10th Army approached the Sissonne marshes; opposite him, von Eberhardt's 7th Army. From October 19, between Liesse-Notre-Dame and Verneuil-sur-Serre, he approached the overflowed Serre and the drainage canal: broken bridges and flooded meadows battered by machine guns. On the 25th, the 16th and 18th Corps gained a foothold on the north bank between Crécy-sur-Serre and Mortiers, Aisne; the 35th Corps crossed the marshes north of Pierrepont, Aisne. On 27 October, Mangin and his 10th Army were secretly relieved by Humbert's 3rd Army to attack east of Metz. On the 28th, the 3rd Army, Lœuilly's Army, received the order to await the results of Debeney's attack (1st Army) before emerging from La Serre.

=== Debeney north of Serre ===
To outflank the Serre from the north, Debeney chose to bypass the massif of Villers-le-Sec, Pleine-Selve, Parpeville on both flanks: the 8th Corps to the east (Chevresis-Monceau), the 20th Corps to the north (Courjumelles) and the 31st Corps further north (elevation 120 south of Origny). After a long artillery preparation, the attack began on 24 October. Lucy (near Ribemont) and Ferrière farm (near La Ferté-Chevresis) were captured with 3,000 prisoners. On the 26th, the 20th and 8th corps seized the massif of Villers-le-Sec, Pleine-Selve, Parpeville and to the south, Chevresis-les-Dames.

== Outcome ==
During the night of October 26-27, the armies of von Hutier and von Eberhardt retreated to the second Hermann position, from Guise to Dercy. On the 27th, the two French armies seized the plateaus of Jonqueuse, Landifay and Montigny-sur-Crécy. Debeney was at the gates of Guise.

== Battle Honour ==
- LA SERRE 1918 is emblazoned on the flags of those French regiments that were present during this battle.

== Voir aussi ==
- Hundred Days Offensive

== Bibliography ==
- la Revue des deux Mondes, Paris : Au Bureau de la Revue des deux Mondes, 1919:6 (p. 99 et 322). OCLC 1764094
- fr:Victor Giraud [in French] (1920). Histoire de la Grande Guerre (in French). Paris: Librairie Hachette.
- Histoire illustrée de la guerre de 1914 (in French).
- De Feriet, René; et al., eds. (1938). La campagne offensive de 1918 et la marche au Rhin (18 juillet 1918 - 28 juin 1919) Tome VII. Deuxième volume. La campagne offensive de 1918 et la marche au Rhin (26 septembre 1918 - 28 juin 1919) [7,2]. Les armées françaises dans la Grande guerre. Based on Official Documents by Direction of the Ministère De la Guerre, Etat-Major de l'Armée – Service Historique (in French). Paris: Imprimerie Nationale.
