= Pleine-Selve =

Pleine-Selve may refer to the following places in France:

- Pleine-Selve, Aisne, a commune in the department of Aisne
- Pleine-Selve, Gironde, a commune in the department of Gironde
