= Remigny =

Remigny or Rémigny may refer to the following places:

in Canada

- Rémigny, Quebec

in France

- Remigny, Aisne, a commune in the department of Aisne
- Remigny, Saône-et-Loire, a commune in the department of Saône-et-Loire
