= Battle of Serres =

Battle of Serres may refer to:

== In Greece ==
- Battle of Serres (1196), a battle between the Bulgarian forces against forces of the Byzantine Empire.
- Battle of Serres (1205), a battle between the Bulgarian forces against forces of the Latin Empire.

== In France ==
- Battle of the Serre, a 1918 Battle of the First World War in France.
