= Neuvillette, Aisne =

Neuvillette
- Commune
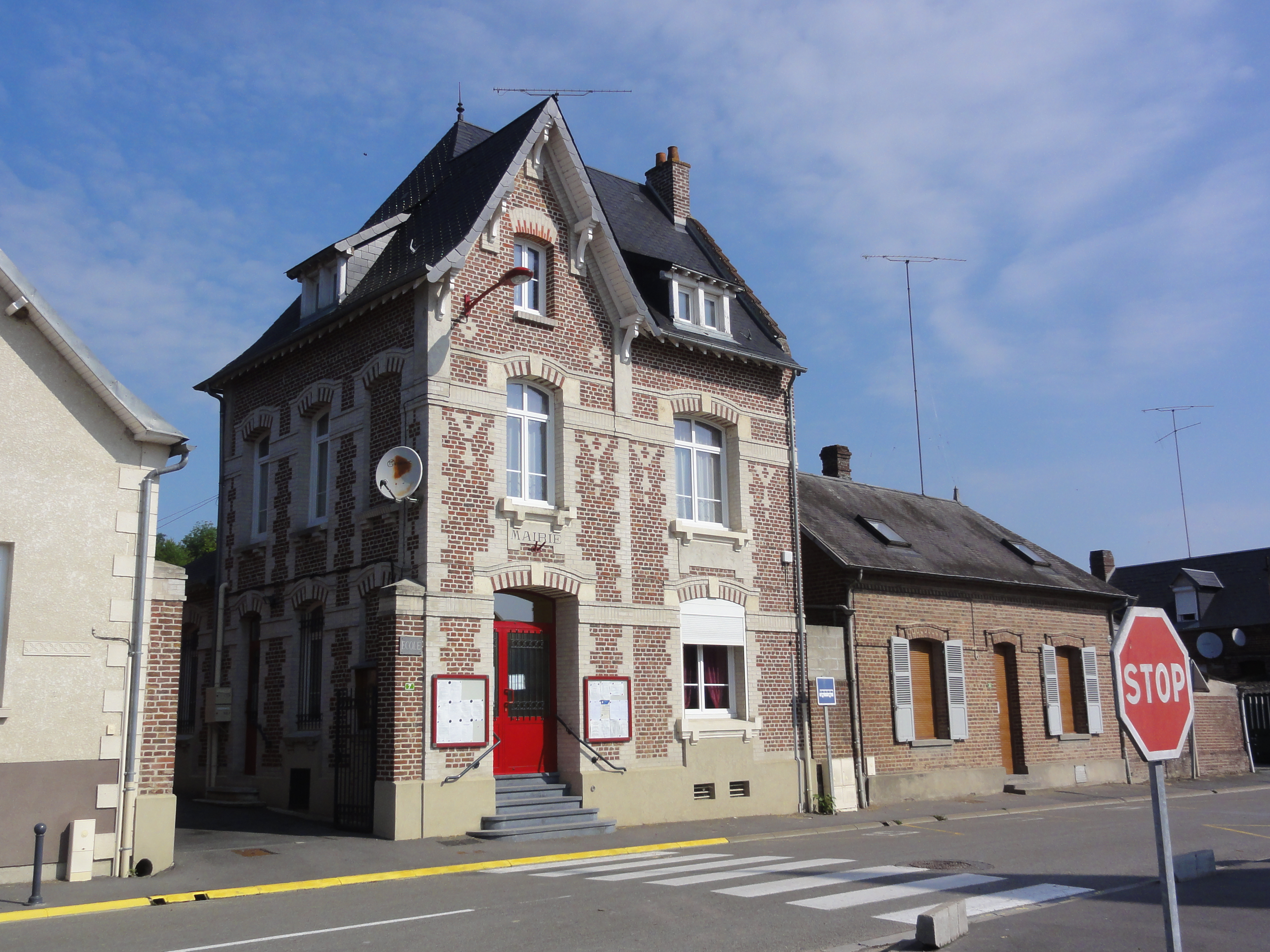
- The town hall of Neuvillette
- Location of Neuvillette
- Location within France Location within Hauts-de-France
- Coordinates: 49°51′16″N 3°28′59″E
- Country: France
- Region: Hauts-de-France
- Department: Aisne
- Arrondissement: Saint-Quentin
- Canton: Ribemont

Government
  - Mayor (2026–32): Sylvain Favereaux
- Area^{1}: 6.44 km^{2} (2.49 sq mi)
- Elevation: 100 m (330 ft)
- Highest elevation: 135 m (443 ft)
- Lowest elevation: 67 m (220 ft)
- Population (2023): 170
  - Density: 26/km^{2} (68/sq mi)
- Time zone: UTC+01:00 (CET)
  - Summer (DST): UTC+02:00 (CEST)
- INSEE/Postal code: 02552 /02390
- ^{1} French Land Register data, which excludes lakes, ponds, glaciers > 1 km^{2} (0.386 sq mi or 247 acres) and river estuaries.

Neuvillette (French pronunciation: [nøvilɛt]) is a commune in the Aisne department in Hauts-de-France in northern France.

== Population ==
Historical population
Year	Pop.	±% p.a.
1968	225	—
1975	200	−1.67%
1982	199	−0.07%
1990	185	−0.91%
1999	196	+0.64%
2007	198	+0.13%
2012	189	−0.93%
2017	186	−0.32%
2023	170	−1.49%
Source: INSEE

== See also ==
- Communes of the Aisne department
