= Parpeville =

- Commune
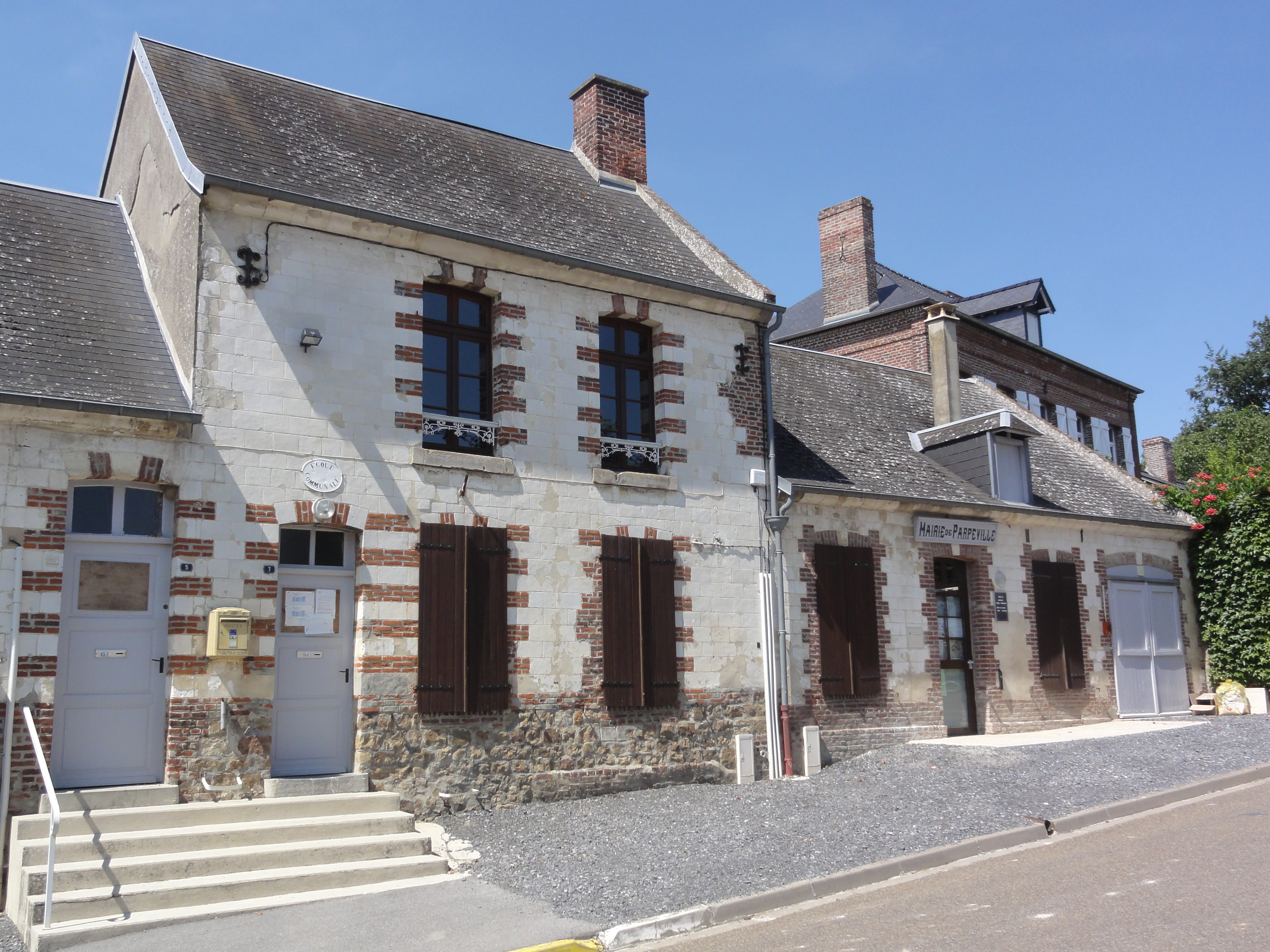
- The town hall and school of Parpeville
- Location of Parpeville
- Location within France Location within Hauts-de-France
- Coordinates: 49°47′09″N 3°32′48″E
- Country: France
- Region: Hauts-de-France
- Department: Aisne
- Arrondissement: Saint-Quentin
- Canton: Ribemont
- Intercommunality: Val de l'Oise

Government
  - Mayor (2026–32): Jérémy Jumeaux
- Area^{1}: 15.82 km^{2} (6.11 sq mi)
- Elevation: 140 m (460 ft)
- Highest elevation: 144 m (472 ft)
- Lowest elevation: 79 m (259 ft)
- Population (2023): 191
  - Density: 12.1/km^{2} (31.3/sq mi)
- Time zone: UTC+01:00 (CET)
  - Summer (DST): UTC+02:00 (CEST)
- INSEE/Postal code: 02592 /02240
- ^{1} French Land Register data, which excludes lakes, ponds, glaciers > 1 km^{2} (0.386 sq mi or 247 acres) and river estuaries.

Parpeville (French pronunciation: [paʁpəvil]) is a commune in the Aisne department in Hauts-de-France in northern France. Situated 24 kilometers east of Saint-Quentin and 28 kilometers northwest of Laon, Parpeville overlooks the surrounding plains due to its varying altitudes, ranging from 79 meters to 144 meters above sea level.

== History and architecture ==
Parpeville has a number of notable landmarks. These include Parpeville Castle, which was built in 1722 by John Macquerel, lord of Quesmy and Parpeville. The castle's main building, flanked by two wings, is built wuith a combination of brick and white stone and has a Mansart-style slate roof. This building has remained in the possession of the same family since its construction. The castle's facade and roofs have been listed as Historical Monuments since 1928.

The village itself has several houses constructed during the 18th and 19th centuries, exemplifying a mix of brick and limestone, sometimes reinforced with sandstone in the foundations. Many houses in Parpeville feature carved or engraved dates of construction.

=== Railway past ===
Parpeville's history is also intertwined with its former railway line, which operated from 1900 to 1958, connecting Ribemont to La Ferté-Chevresis. The line carried significant passenger and freight traffic during its heyday, but the rise of automobiles led to its eventual closure in 1958. Today, some sections of the old railway line remain as hiking trails.

== Land use ==
The commune's land use is primarily agricultural, with approximately 97.5% of the land dedicated to agricultural purposes, particularly arable farming.

== Religious heritage ==
The village has played host to the Congregation of Franciscan Sisters of the Sacred Heart since its founding in 1867. The congregation, established by Father Virgile Adam, focused on educating young girls and caring for orphans. The sisters later wore the habit of the Third Order of Saint Francis.

== Politics and administration ==
Parpeville is part of the community of communes of Val de l'Oise, an inter-municipal cooperation institution. Administratively, it belongs to the arrondissement of Saint-Quentin, the department of Aisne, and the Hauts-de-France region. The municipality's mayor, as of 2026, is Jeremy Jumeaux.

== Places and monuments ==
Aside from the Parpeville Castle, other local landmarks include the modern Church of Saint-Leu, featuring two chapels in the transept and a 14th-15th-century stone statue of Saint Leu. Additionally, a commemorative stained glass window crafted by Alphonse Léopold De Troeyer in 1930 stands in memory of the village's fallen soldiers during World War I. There is also a wayside cross and a memorial.

== Population ==
Historical population
Year	Pop.	±% p.a.
1968	283	—
1975	226	−3.16%
1982	244	+1.10%
1990	216	−1.51%
1999	219	+0.15%
2007	227	+0.45%
2012	237	+0.87%
2017	189	−4.43%
2023	191	+0.18%
Source: INSEE

== See also ==
- Communes of the Aisne department
