= Séry-lès-Mézières =

- Commune
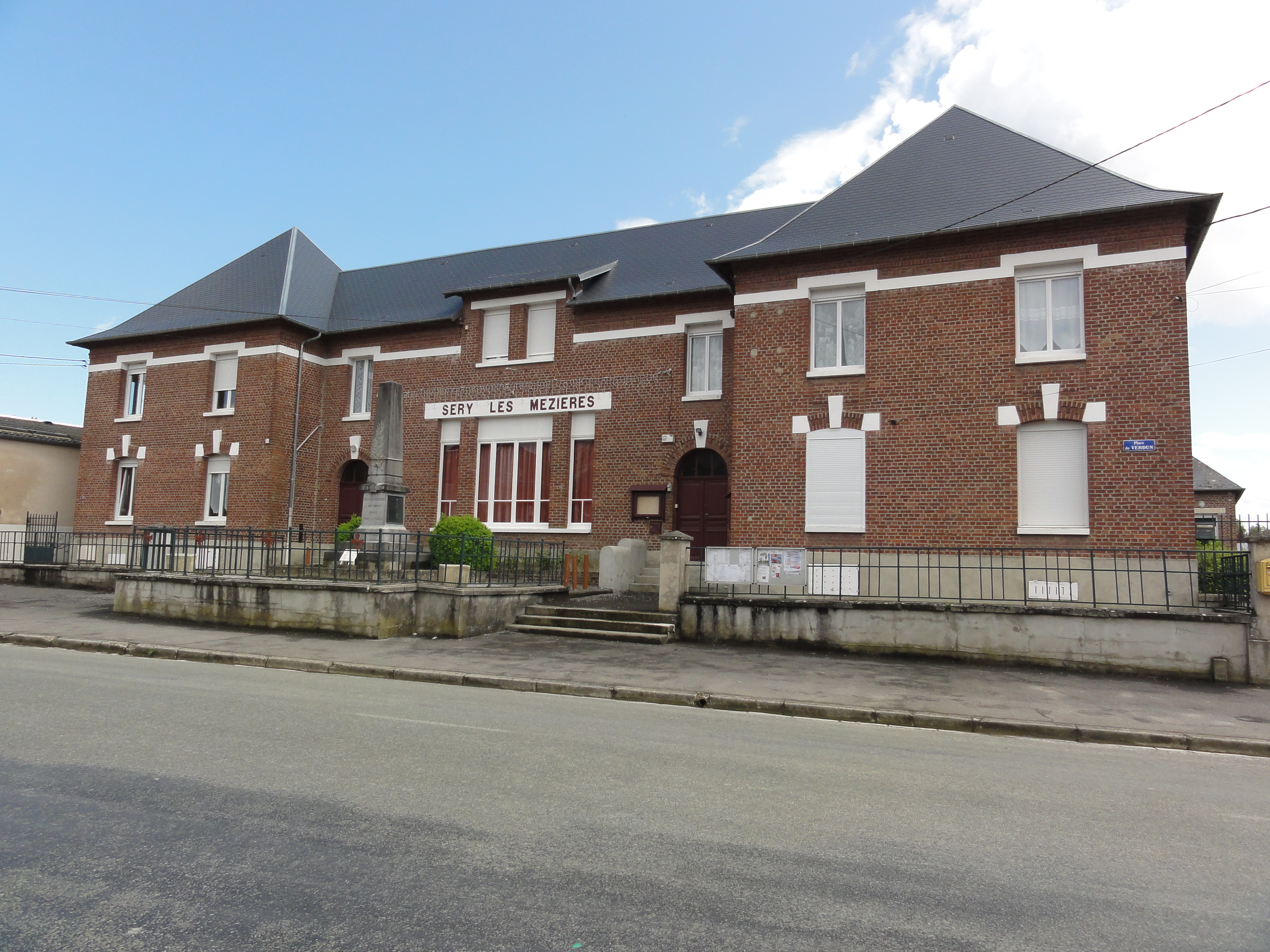
- The town hall of Séry-lès-Mézières
- Location of Séry-lès-Mézières
- Location within France Location within Hauts-de-France
- Coordinates: 49°46′30″N 3°25′14″E
- Country: France
- Region: Hauts-de-France
- Department: Aisne
- Arrondissement: Saint-Quentin
- Canton: Ribemont
- Intercommunality: Val de l'Oise

Government
  - Mayor (2026–32): Stéphanie Gosset
- Area^{1}: 11.51 km^{2} (4.44 sq mi)
- Elevation: 75 m (246 ft)
- Highest elevation: 115 m (377 ft)
- Lowest elevation: 57 m (187 ft)
- Population (2023): 601
  - Density: 52.2/km^{2} (135/sq mi)
- Time zone: UTC+01:00 (CET)
  - Summer (DST): UTC+02:00 (CEST)
- INSEE/Postal code: 02717 /02240
- ^{1} French Land Register data, which excludes lakes, ponds, glaciers > 1 km^{2} (0.386 sq mi or 247 acres) and river estuaries.

Séry-lès-Mézières (French pronunciation: [seʁi lɛ mezjɛʁ], literally Séry near Mézières) is a commune in the Aisne department in Hauts-de-France in northern France.

== Population ==
Historical population
Year	Pop.	±% p.a.
1968	748	—
1975	708	−0.78%
1982	650	−1.21%
1990	644	−0.12%
1999	627	−0.30%
2007	648	+0.41%
2012	639	−0.28%
2017	576	−2.05%
2023	601	+0.71%
Source: INSEE

== See also ==
- Communes of the Aisne department
