= Sissy, Aisne =

Sissy
- Commune
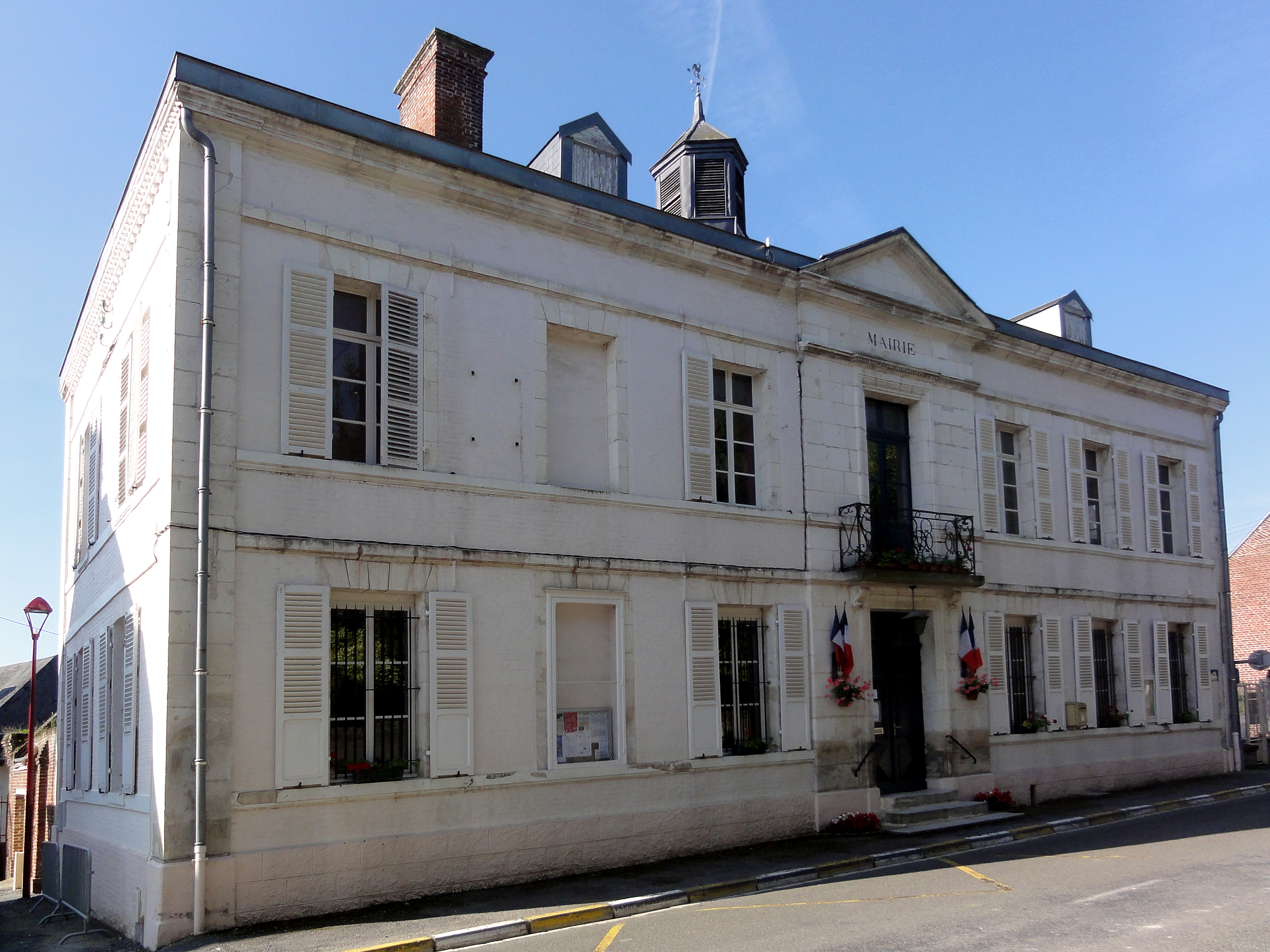
- The town hall of Sissy
- Location of Sissy
- Location within France Location within Hauts-de-France
- Coordinates: 49°48′14″N 3°25′50″E
- Country: France
- Region: Hauts-de-France
- Department: Aisne
- Arrondissement: Saint-Quentin
- Canton: Ribemont
- Intercommunality: Val de l'Oise

Government
  - Mayor (2026–32): Martine Basseville
- Area^{1}: 10.76 km^{2} (4.15 sq mi)
- Elevation: 74 m (243 ft)
- Highest elevation: 127 m (417 ft)
- Lowest elevation: 62 m (203 ft)
- Population (2023): 505
  - Density: 46.9/km^{2} (122/sq mi)
- Time zone: UTC+01:00 (CET)
  - Summer (DST): UTC+02:00 (CEST)
- INSEE/Postal code: 02721 /02240
- ^{1} French Land Register data, which excludes lakes, ponds, glaciers > 1 km^{2} (0.386 sq mi or 247 acres) and river estuaries.

Sissy (French pronunciation: [sisi]) is a commune in the Aisne department in Hauts-de-France in northern France.

== Population ==
Historical population
Year	Pop.	±% p.a.
1968	591	—
1975	513	−2.00%
1982	510	−0.08%
1990	483	−0.68%
1999	502	+0.43%
2007	494	−0.20%
2012	482	−0.49%
2017	476	−0.25%
2023	505	+0.99%
Source: INSEE

== See also ==
- Communes of the Aisne department
