= Villers-le-Sec, Aisne =

Villers-le-Sec
- Commune
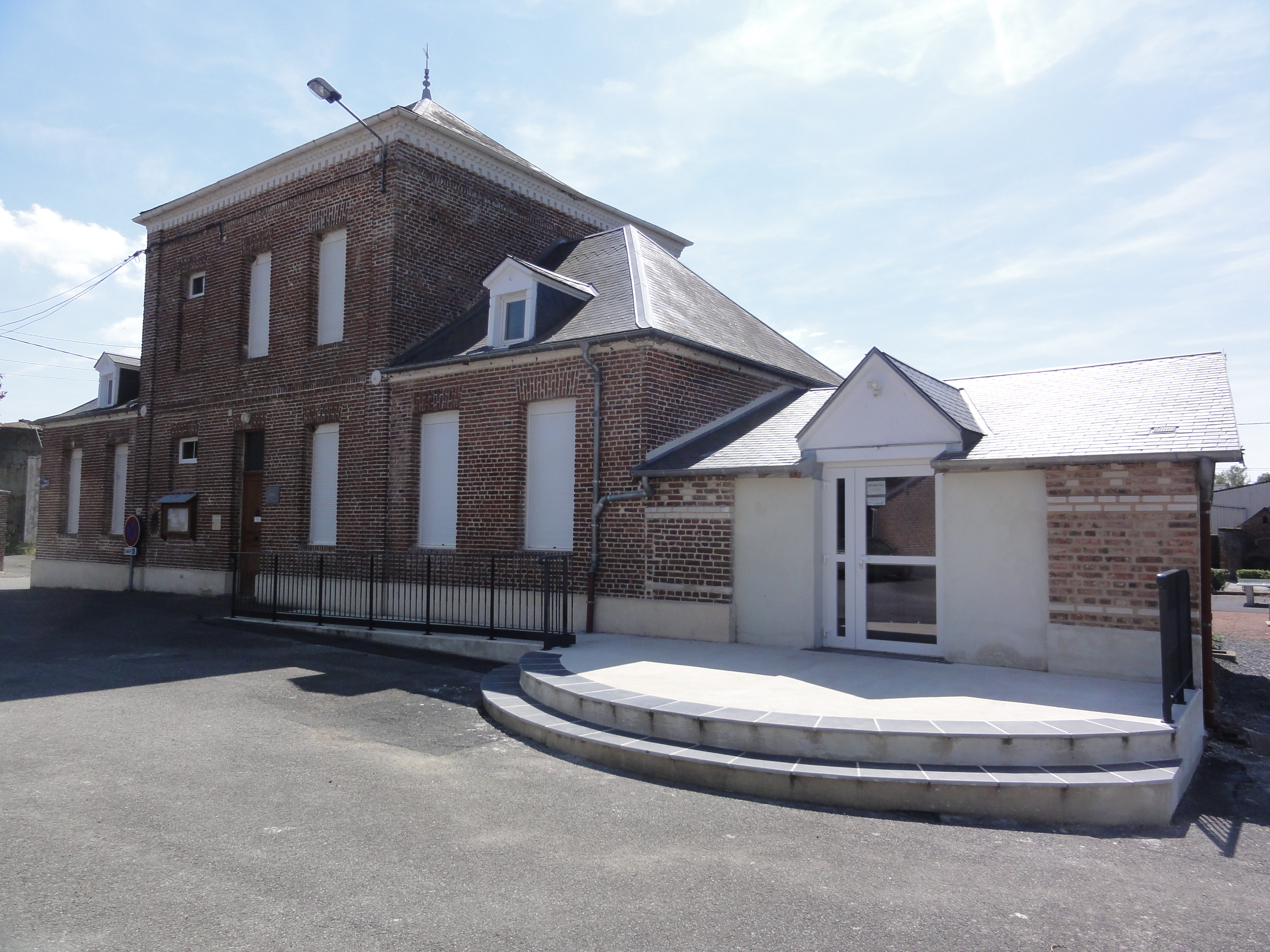
- The town hall of Villers-le-Sec
- Location of Villers-le-Sec
- Location within France Location within Hauts-de-France
- Coordinates: 49°46′46″N 3°30′05″E
- Country: France
- Region: Hauts-de-France
- Department: Aisne
- Arrondissement: Saint-Quentin
- Canton: Ribemont
- Intercommunality: Val de l'Oise

Government
  - Mayor (2026–32): Bruno Moreau
- Area^{1}: 10.57 km^{2} (4.08 sq mi)
- Elevation: 144 m (472 ft)
- Highest elevation: 134 m (440 ft)
- Lowest elevation: 74 m (243 ft)
- Population (2023): 262
  - Density: 24.8/km^{2} (64.2/sq mi)
- Time zone: UTC+01:00 (CET)
  - Summer (DST): UTC+02:00 (CEST)
- INSEE/Postal code: 02813 /02240
- ^{1} French Land Register data, which excludes lakes, ponds, glaciers > 1 km^{2} (0.386 sq mi or 247 acres) and river estuaries.

Villers-le-Sec (French pronunciation: [vilɛʁ lə sɛk]) is a commune in the Aisne department in Hauts-de-France in northern France.

== Population ==
Historical population
Year	Pop.	±% p.a.
1968	262	—
1975	270	+0.43%
1982	227	−2.45%
1990	237	+0.54%
1999	236	−0.05%
2007	263	+1.36%
2012	292	+2.11%
2017	267	−1.77%
2023	262	−0.31%
Source: INSEE

== See also ==
- Communes of the Aisne department
