= Thenelles =

- Commune
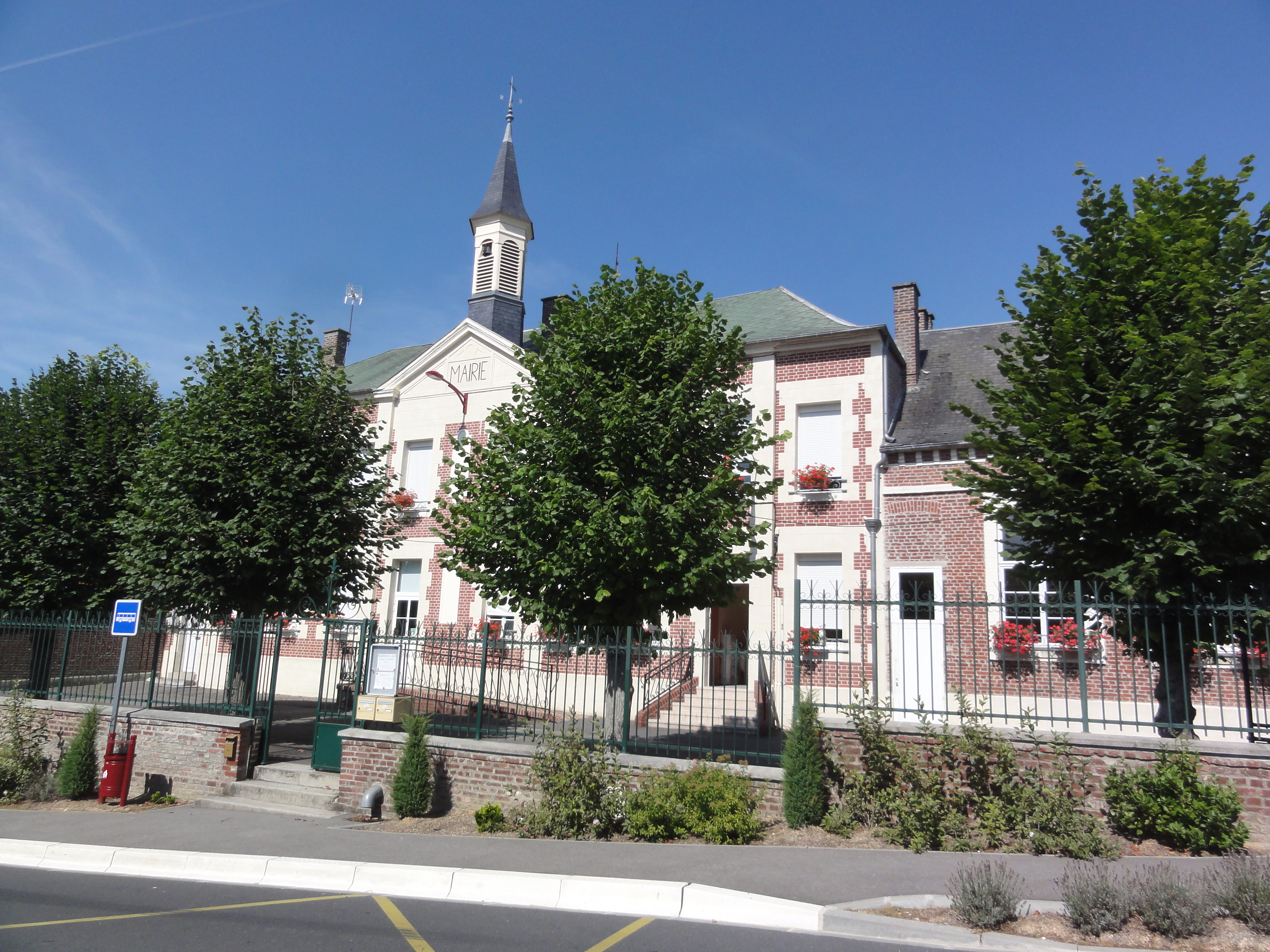
- The town hall of Thenelles

- Coat of arms
- Location of Thenelles
- Location within France Location within Hauts-de-France
- Coordinates: 49°49′56″N 3°28′09″E
- Country: France
- Region: Hauts-de-France
- Department: Aisne
- Arrondissement: Saint-Quentin
- Canton: Ribemont

Government
  - Mayor (2026–32): Cédric Mouny
- Area^{1}: 6.99 km^{2} (2.70 sq mi)
- Elevation: 71 m (233 ft)
- Highest elevation: 133 m (436 ft)
- Lowest elevation: 67 m (220 ft)
- Population (2023): 541
  - Density: 77.4/km^{2} (200/sq mi)
- Time zone: UTC+01:00 (CET)
  - Summer (DST): UTC+02:00 (CEST)
- INSEE/Postal code: 02741 /02390
- ^{1} French Land Register data, which excludes lakes, ponds, glaciers > 1 km^{2} (0.386 sq mi or 247 acres) and river estuaries.

Thenelles (French pronunciation: [tənɛl]) is a commune in the Aisne department and Hauts-de-France region of northern France.

== Population ==
Historical population
Year	Pop.	±% p.a.
1968	868	—
1975	787	−1.39%
1982	675	−2.17%
1990	623	−1.00%
1999	570	−0.98%
2007	590	+0.43%
2012	555	−1.22%
2017	550	−0.18%
2023	541	−0.27%
Source: INSEE

== See also ==
- Communes of the Aisne department
