= Surfontaine =

- Commune
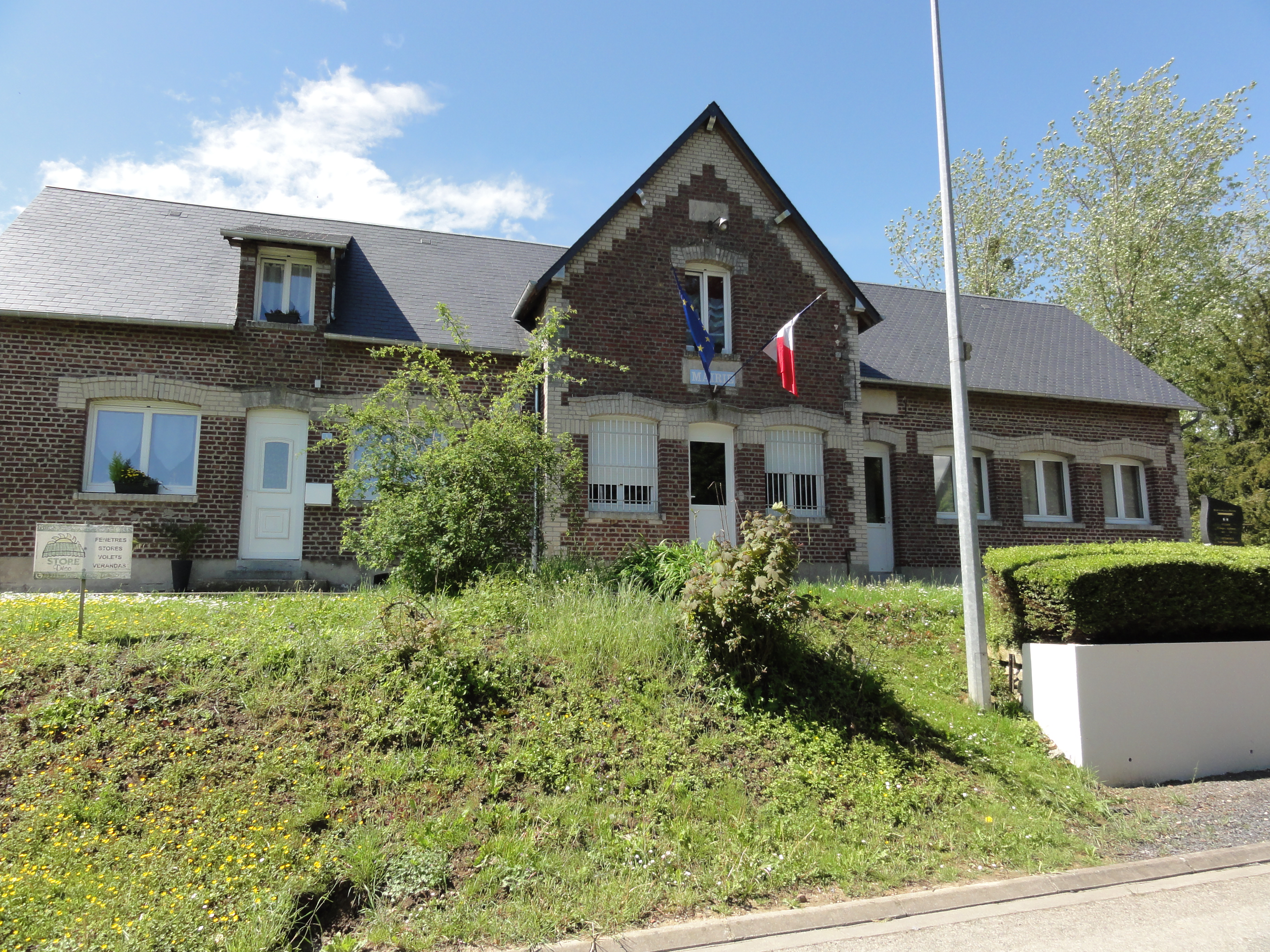
- The town hall of Surfontaine
- Location of Surfontaine
- Location within France Location within Hauts-de-France
- Coordinates: 49°45′06″N 3°27′58″E
- Country: France
- Region: Hauts-de-France
- Department: Aisne
- Arrondissement: Saint-Quentin
- Canton: Ribemont
- Intercommunality: Val de l'Oise

Government
  - Mayor (2026–32): Anne-Sophie Leplay
- Area^{1}: 6.38 km^{2} (2.46 sq mi)
- Highest elevation: 121 m (397 ft)
- Lowest elevation: 74 m (243 ft)
- Population (2023): 92
  - Density: 14/km^{2} (37/sq mi)
- Time zone: UTC+01:00 (CET)
  - Summer (DST): UTC+02:00 (CEST)
- INSEE/Postal code: 02732 /02240
- ^{1} French Land Register data, which excludes lakes, ponds, glaciers > 1 km^{2} (0.386 sq mi or 247 acres) and river estuaries.

Surfontaine (French pronunciation: [syʁfɔ̃tɛn]) is a commune in the Aisne department in Hauts-de-France in northern France.

== Population ==
Historical population
Year	Pop.	±% p.a.
1968	129	—
1975	101	−3.44%
1982	80	−3.28%
1990	66	−2.38%
1999	83	+2.58%
2007	99	+2.23%
2012	102	+0.60%
2017	102	+0.00%
2023	92	−1.71%
Source: INSEE

== See also ==
- Communes of the Aisne department
