= Mont-d'Origny =

- Commune
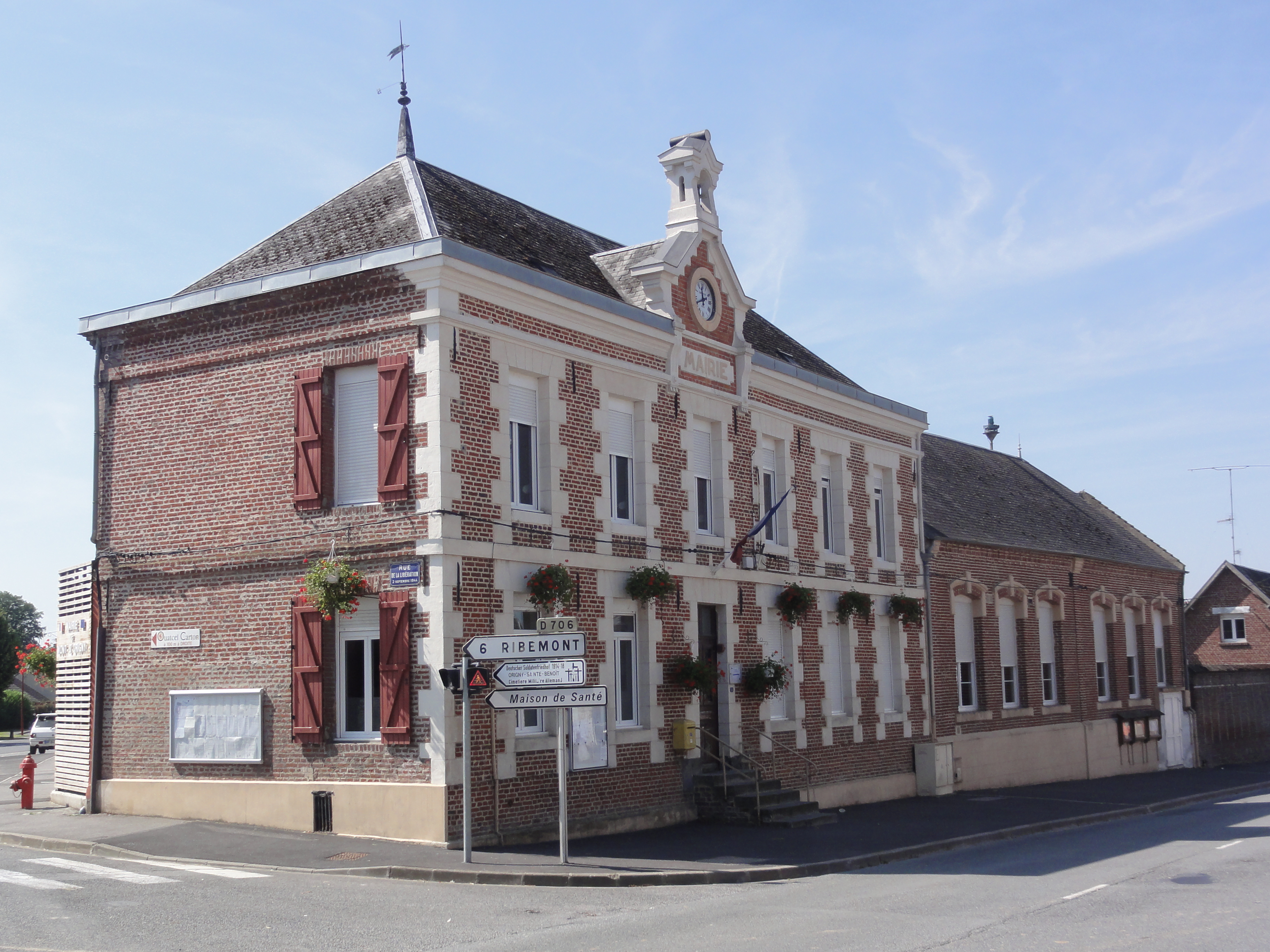
- The town hall of Mont-d'Origny
- Location of Mont-d'Origny
- Location within France Location within Hauts-de-France
- Coordinates: 49°50′37″N 3°30′03″E
- Country: France
- Region: Hauts-de-France
- Department: Aisne
- Arrondissement: Saint-Quentin
- Canton: Ribemont

Government
  - Mayor (2026–32): Alexandre Blanchart
- Area^{1}: 13.52 km^{2} (5.22 sq mi)
- Elevation: 82 m (269 ft)
- Highest elevation: 143 m (469 ft)
- Lowest elevation: 71 m (233 ft)
- Population (2023): 839
  - Density: 62.1/km^{2} (161/sq mi)
- Time zone: UTC+01:00 (CET)
  - Summer (DST): UTC+02:00 (CEST)
- INSEE/Postal code: 02503 /02390
- ^{1} French Land Register data, which excludes lakes, ponds, glaciers > 1 km^{2} (0.386 sq mi or 247 acres) and river estuaries.

Mont-d'Origny (French pronunciation: [mɔ̃ dɔʁiɲi]) is a commune in the Aisne department in Hauts-de-France in northern France.

== Population ==
Historical population
Year	Pop.	±% p.a.
1968	881	—
1975	789	−1.56%
1982	780	−0.16%
1990	957	+2.59%
1999	919	−0.45%
2007	887	−0.44%
2012	877	−0.23%
2017	847	−0.69%
2023	839	−0.16%
Source: INSEE

== See also ==
- Communes of the Aisne department
