= Berthenicourt =

- Commune
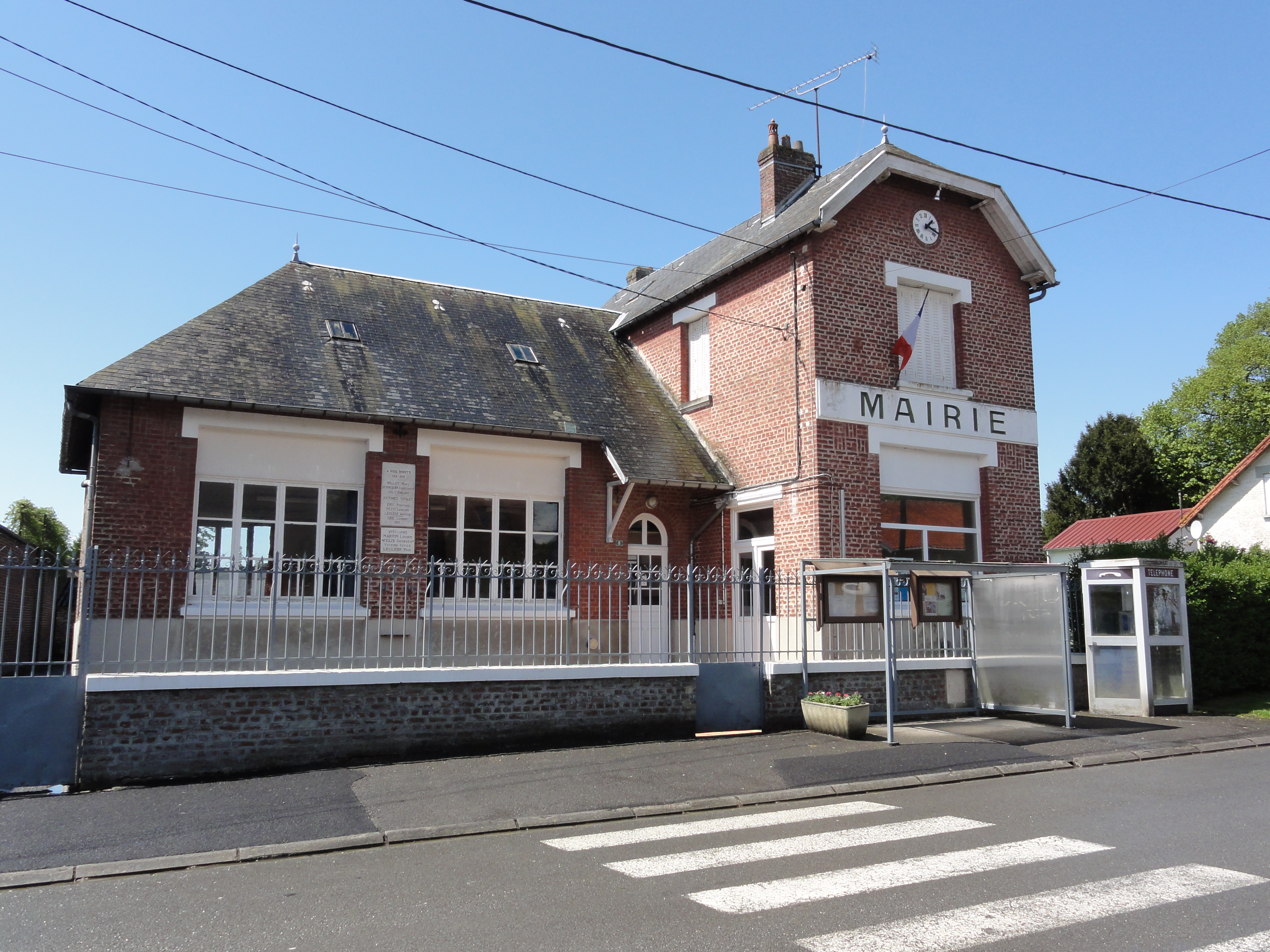
- Town hall
- Location of Berthenicourt
- Location within France Location within Hauts-de-France
- Coordinates: 49°46′20″N 3°22′56″E
- Country: France
- Region: Hauts-de-France
- Department: Aisne
- Arrondissement: Saint-Quentin
- Canton: Ribemont
- Intercommunality: Val de l'Oise

Government
  - Mayor (2026–32): Camille Vansteenberghe
- Area^{1}: 3.07 km^{2} (1.19 sq mi)
- Elevation: 70 m (230 ft)
- Highest elevation: 108 m (354 ft)
- Lowest elevation: 58 m (190 ft)
- Population (2023): 203
  - Density: 66.1/km^{2} (171/sq mi)
- Time zone: UTC+01:00 (CET)
  - Summer (DST): UTC+02:00 (CEST)
- INSEE/Postal code: 02075 /02240
- ^{1} French Land Register data, which excludes lakes, ponds, glaciers > 1 km^{2} (0.386 sq mi or 247 acres) and river estuaries.

Berthenicourt (French pronunciation: [bɛʁtənikuʁ]) is a commune in the department of Aisne in Hauts-de-France in northern France.

== Population ==
Historical population
Year	Pop.	±% p.a.
1968	176	—
1975	187	+0.87%
1982	177	−0.78%
1990	200	+1.54%
1999	200	+0.00%
2007	207	+0.43%
2012	207	+0.00%
2017	199	−0.79%
2023	203	+0.33%
Source: INSEE

== See also ==
- Communes of the Aisne department
