= Vendeuil =

- Commune
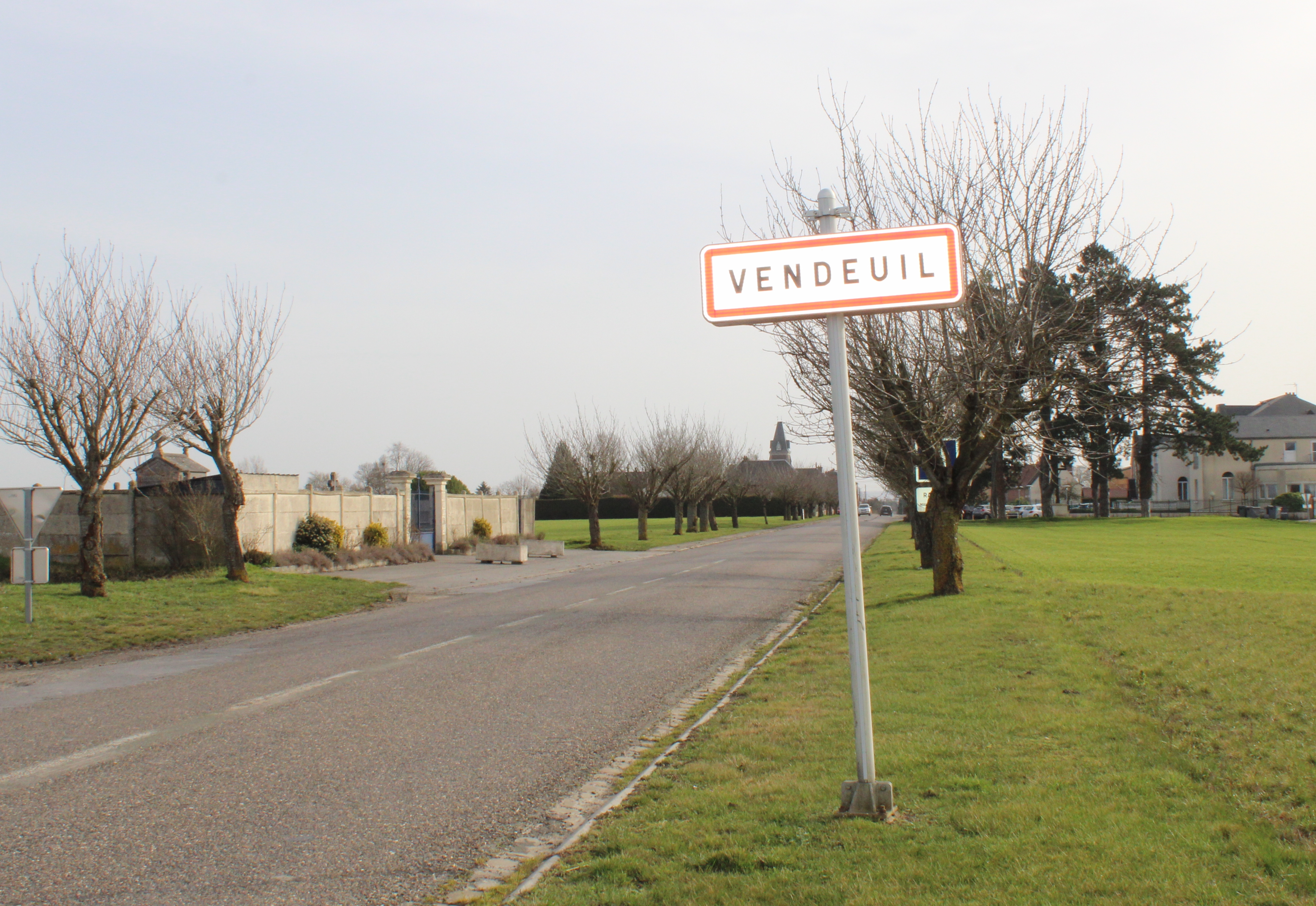
- The road into Vendeuil

- Coat of arms
- Location of Vendeuil
- Location within France Location within Hauts-de-France
- Coordinates: 49°43′00″N 3°21′09″E
- Country: France
- Region: Hauts-de-France
- Department: Aisne
- Arrondissement: Saint-Quentin
- Canton: Ribemont
- Intercommunality: Val de l'Oise

Government
  - Mayor (2026–32): André Da Fonseca
- Area^{1}: 14.45 km^{2} (5.58 sq mi)
- Elevation: 76 m (249 ft)
- Highest elevation: 112 m (367 ft)
- Lowest elevation: 49 m (161 ft)
- Population (2023): 923
  - Density: 63.9/km^{2} (165/sq mi)
- Time zone: UTC+01:00 (CET)
  - Summer (DST): UTC+02:00 (CEST)
- INSEE/Postal code: 02775 /02800
- ^{1} French Land Register data, which excludes lakes, ponds, glaciers > 1 km^{2} (0.386 sq mi or 247 acres) and river estuaries.

Vendeuil (French pronunciation: [vɑ̃dœj]) is a commune in the Aisne department in Hauts-de-France in northern France.

== Population ==
Historical population
| Year | Pop. | ±% p.a. |
|---|---|---|
| 1968 | 956 | — |
| 1975 | 883 | −1.13% |
| 1982 | 867 | −0.26% |
| 1990 | 881 | +0.20% |
| 1999 | 856 | −0.32% |
| 2007 | 908 | +0.74% |
| 2012 | 920 | +0.26% |
| 2017 | 951 | +0.67% |
| 2023 | 923 | −0.50% |
Source: INSEE

== See also ==
- Communes of the Aisne department
