= Canton of Ribemont =

Coordinates: 49°47′47″N 3°27′36″E

Ribemont
- Canton
- Interactive map of Ribemont
- Country: France
- Region: Hauts-de-France
- Department: Aisne
- No. of communes: {{{nbcomm}}}
- Area: 465.99 km^{2} (179.92 sq mi)
- Population (2023): 25,949
  - Density: 55.686/km^{2} (144.23/sq mi)
- INSEE code: 02 12

The canton of Ribemont is an administrative division in northern France. At the French canton reorganisation which came into effect in March 2015, the canton was expanded from 15 to 52 communes:

1. Alaincourt
2. Annois
3. Artemps
4. Aubigny-aux-Kaisnes
5. Benay
6. Berthenicourt
7. Bray-Saint-Christophe
8. Brissay-Choigny
9. Brissy-Hamégicourt
10. Cerizy
11. Châtillon-sur-Oise
12. Chevresis-Monceau
13. Clastres
14. Cugny
15. Dallon
16. Dury
17. Essigny-le-Grand
18. La Ferté-Chevresis
19. Flavy-le-Martel
20. Fontaine-lès-Clercs
21. Gibercourt
22. Happencourt
23. Hinacourt
24. Itancourt
25. Jussy
26. Ly-Fontaine
27. Mézières-sur-Oise
28. Mont-d'Origny
29. Montescourt-Lizerolles
30. Moÿ-de-l'Aisne
31. Neuvillette
32. Ollezy
33. Origny-Sainte-Benoite
34. Parpeville
35. Pithon
36. Pleine-Selve
37. Regny
38. Remigny
39. Renansart
40. Ribemont
41. Saint-Simon
42. Seraucourt-le-Grand
43. Séry-lès-Mézières
44. Sissy
45. Sommette-Eaucourt
46. Surfontaine
47. Thenelles
48. Tugny-et-Pont
49. Urvillers
50. Vendeuil
51. Villers-le-Sec
52. Villers-Saint-Christophe

== Demographics ==
Historical population
Year	Pop.	±% p.a.
2013	26,800	—
2018	26,422	−0.28%
Source: INSEE

== See also ==
- Cantons of the Aisne department
- Communes of France
