= Ly-Fontaine =

- Commune
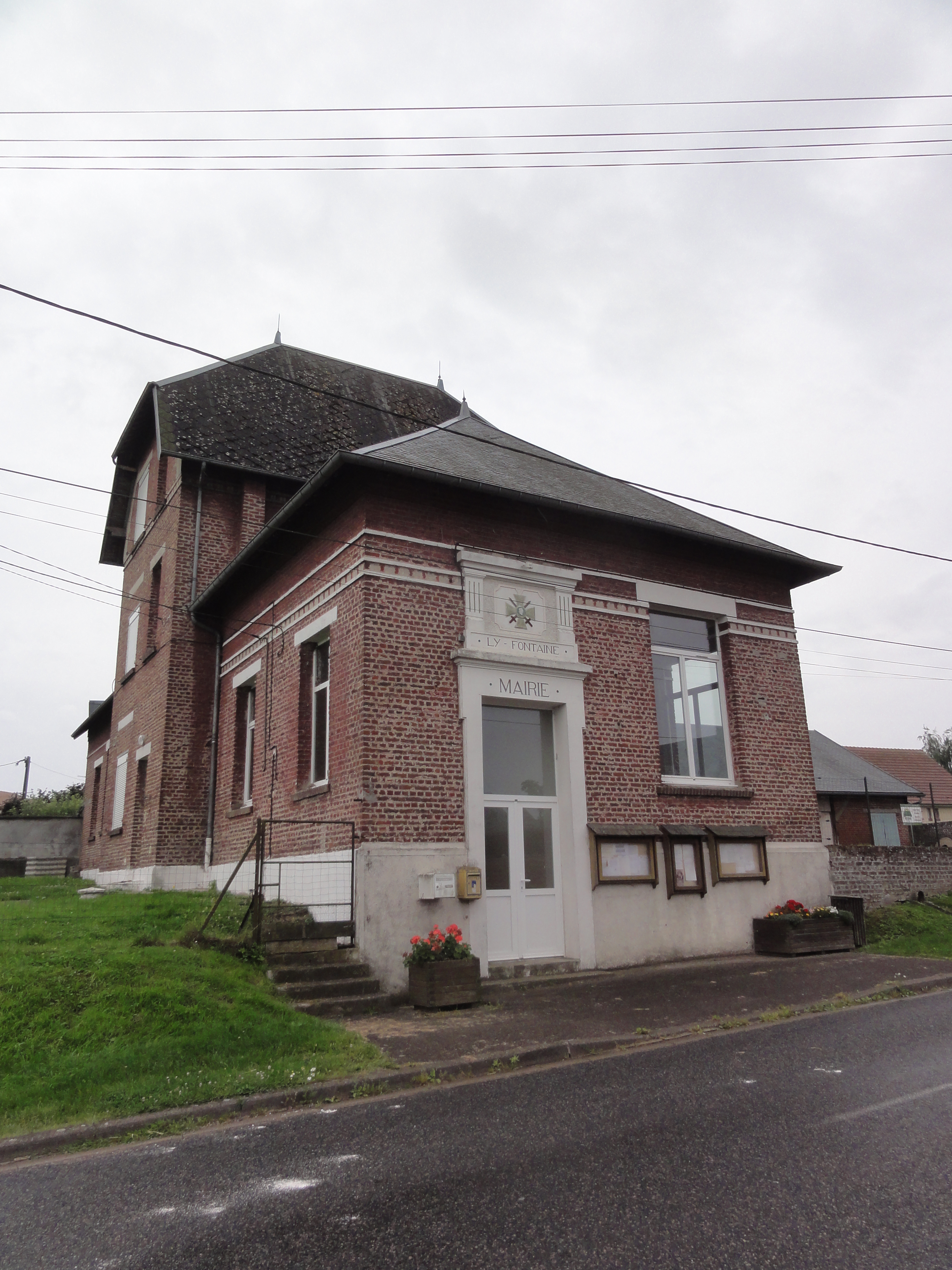
- The town hall of Ly-Fontaine
- Location of Ly-Fontaine
- Location within France Location within Hauts-de-France
- Coordinates: 49°44′07″N 3°18′31″E
- Country: France
- Region: Hauts-de-France
- Department: Aisne
- Arrondissement: Saint-Quentin
- Canton: Ribemont

Government
  - Mayor (2026–32): Jérôme Vasseur
- Area^{1}: 3.47 km^{2} (1.34 sq mi)
- Elevation: 90 m (300 ft)
- Highest elevation: 100 m (330 ft)
- Lowest elevation: 65 m (213 ft)
- Population (2023): 118
  - Density: 34.0/km^{2} (88.1/sq mi)
- Time zone: UTC+01:00 (CET)
  - Summer (DST): UTC+02:00 (CEST)
- INSEE/Postal code: 02446 /02440
- ^{1} French Land Register data, which excludes lakes, ponds, glaciers > 1 km^{2} (0.386 sq mi or 247 acres) and river estuaries.

Ly-Fontaine (French pronunciation: [lifɔ̃tɛn]) is a commune in the Aisne department in Hauts-de-France in northern France.

== Population ==
Historical population
Year	Pop.	±% p.a.
1968	83	—
1975	89	+1.00%
1982	77	−2.05%
1990	72	−0.84%
1999	87	+2.12%
2007	102	+2.01%
2012	132	+5.29%
2017	121	−1.73%
2023	118	−0.42%
Source: INSEE

== See also ==
- Communes of the Aisne department
