= Hinacourt =

- Commune
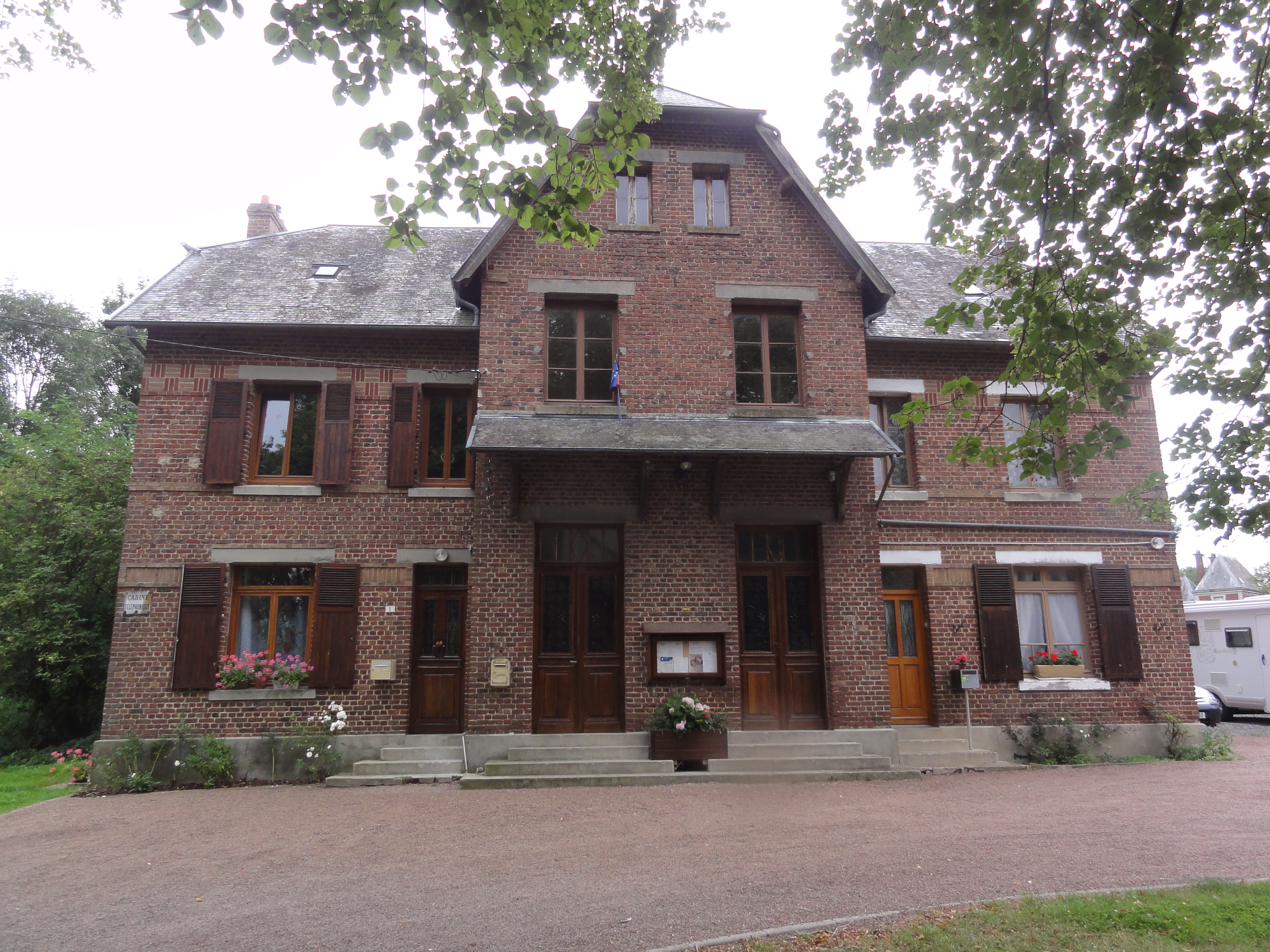
- The town hall of Hinacourt
- Location of Hinacourt
- Location within France Location within Hauts-de-France
- Coordinates: 49°44′45″N 3°17′48″E
- Country: France
- Region: Hauts-de-France
- Department: Aisne
- Arrondissement: Saint-Quentin
- Canton: Ribemont

Government
  - Mayor (2026–32): Brigitte Salingue
- Area^{1}: 3.09 km^{2} (1.19 sq mi)
- Elevation: 95 m (312 ft)
- Highest elevation: 102 m (335 ft)
- Lowest elevation: 76 m (249 ft)
- Population (2023): 28
  - Density: 9.1/km^{2} (23/sq mi)
- Time zone: UTC+01:00 (CET)
  - Summer (DST): UTC+02:00 (CEST)
- INSEE/Postal code: 02380 /02440
- ^{1} French Land Register data, which excludes lakes, ponds, glaciers > 1 km^{2} (0.386 sq mi or 247 acres) and river estuaries.

Hinacourt (French pronunciation: [inakuʁ]) is a commune in the Aisne department in Hauts-de-France in northern France.

== Population ==
Historical population
Year	Pop.	±% p.a.
1968	67	—
1975	62	−1.10%
1982	62	+0.00%
1990	46	−3.66%
1999	41	−1.27%
2007	35	−1.96%
2012	32	−1.78%
2017	25	−4.82%
2023	28	+1.91%
Source: INSEE

== See also ==
- Communes of the Aisne department
