= Urvillers =

- Commune
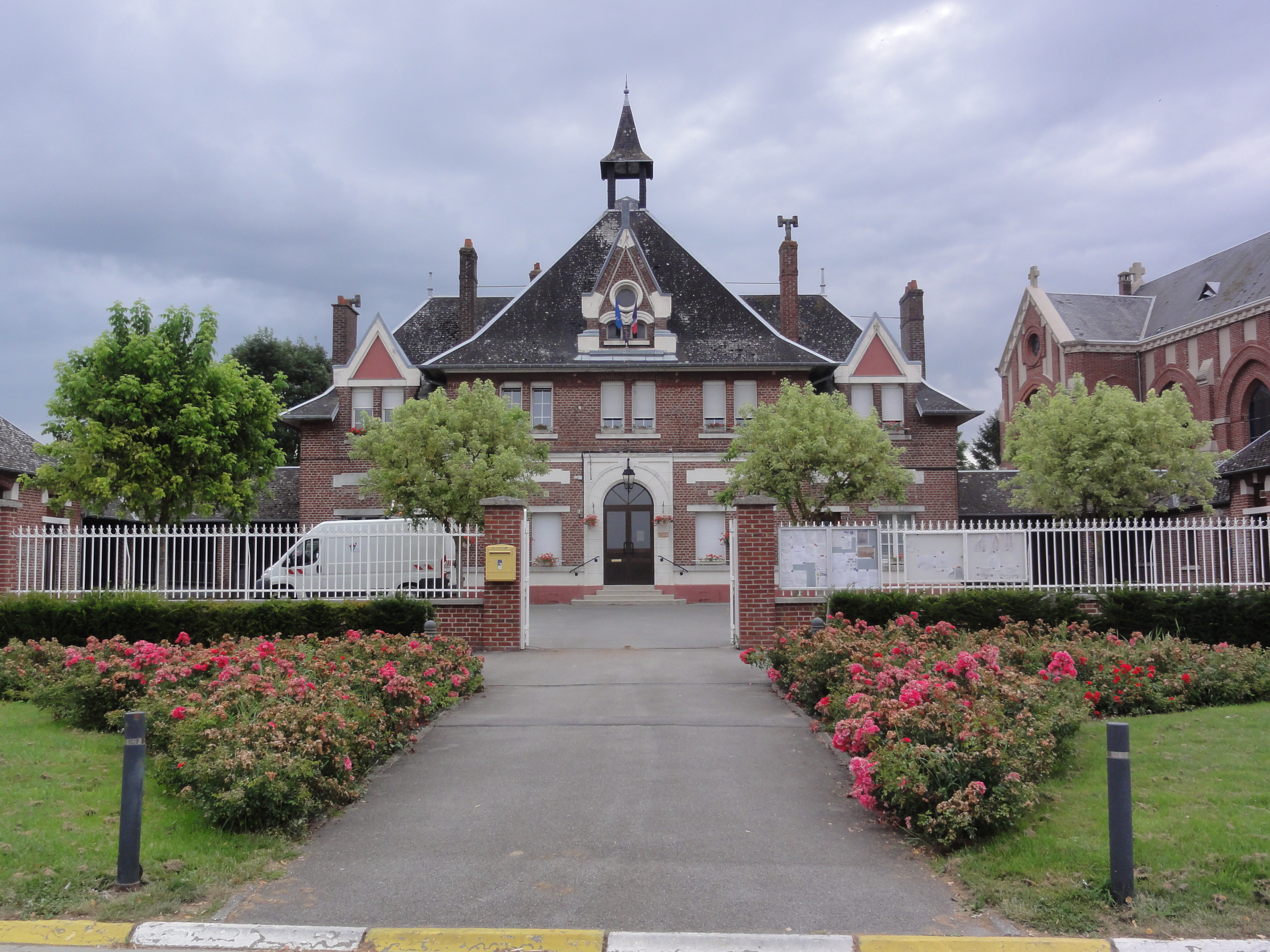
- The town hall of Urvillers

- Coat of arms
- Location of Urvillers
- Location within France Location within Hauts-de-France
- Coordinates: 49°47′24″N 3°18′37″E
- Country: France
- Region: Hauts-de-France
- Department: Aisne
- Arrondissement: Saint-Quentin
- Canton: Ribemont

Government
  - Mayor (2026–32): Bruno Decarsin
- Area^{1}: 13.69 km^{2} (5.29 sq mi)
- Elevation: 111 m (364 ft)
- Highest elevation: 126 m (413 ft)
- Lowest elevation: 72 m (236 ft)
- Population (2023): 687
  - Density: 50.2/km^{2} (130/sq mi)
- Time zone: UTC+01:00 (CET)
  - Summer (DST): UTC+02:00 (CEST)
- INSEE/Postal code: 02756 /02690
- ^{1} French Land Register data, which excludes lakes, ponds, glaciers > 1 km^{2} (0.386 sq mi or 247 acres) and river estuaries.

Urvillers is a commune in the Aisne department in Hauts-de-France in northern France.

== Population ==
Historical population
Year	Pop.	±% p.a.
1968	539	—
1975	545	+0.16%
1982	650	+2.55%
1990	623	−0.53%
1999	594	−0.53%
2007	597	+0.06%
2012	616	+0.63%
2017	659	+1.36%
2023	687	+0.70%
Source: INSEE

== See also ==
- Communes of the Aisne department
