= Chevresis-Monceau =

- Commune
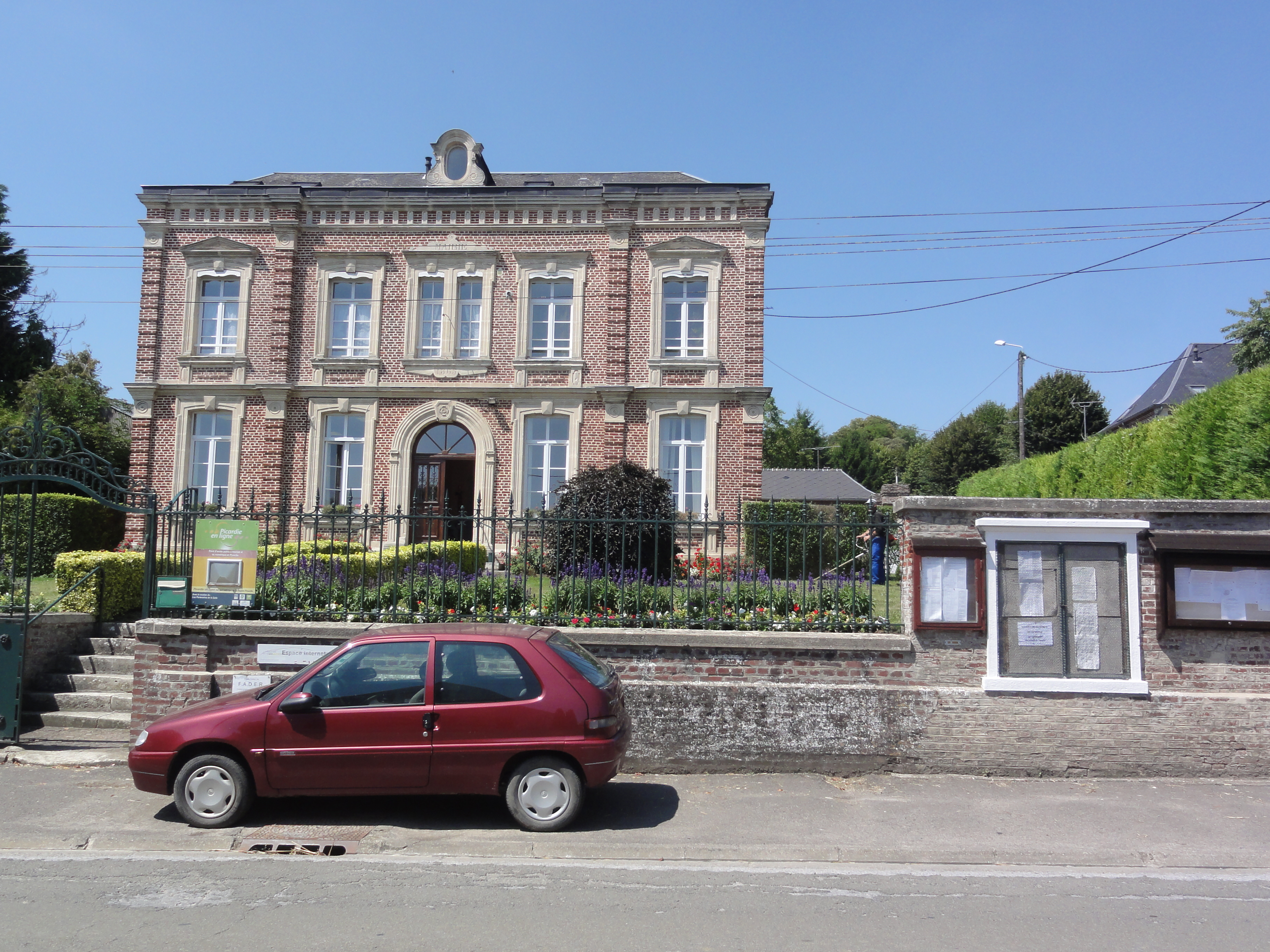
- The town hall of Chevresis-Monceau
- Location of Chevresis-Monceau
- Location within France Location within Hauts-de-France
- Coordinates: 49°45′16″N 3°34′21″E
- Country: France
- Region: Hauts-de-France
- Department: Aisne
- Arrondissement: Saint-Quentin
- Canton: Ribemont
- Intercommunality: Val de l'Oise

Government
  - Mayor (2026–32): Sébastien Solari
- Area^{1}: 16.85 km^{2} (6.51 sq mi)
- Elevation: 65 m (213 ft)
- Highest elevation: 137 m (449 ft)
- Lowest elevation: 60 m (200 ft)
- Population (2023): 329
  - Density: 19.5/km^{2} (50.6/sq mi)
- Time zone: UTC+01:00 (CET)
  - Summer (DST): UTC+02:00 (CEST)
- INSEE/Postal code: 02184 /02270
- ^{1} French Land Register data, which excludes lakes, ponds, glaciers > 1 km^{2} (0.386 sq mi or 247 acres) and river estuaries.

Chevresis-Monceau (French pronunciation: [ʃəvʁəzi mɔ̃so]) is a commune in the Aisne department in Hauts-de-France in northern France.

== Population ==
Historical population
| Year | Pop. | ±% p.a. |
|---|---|---|
| 1968 | 340 | — |
| 1975 | 327 | −0.56% |
| 1982 | 313 | −0.62% |
| 1990 | 348 | +1.33% |
| 1999 | 368 | +0.62% |
| 2007 | 352 | −0.55% |
| 2012 | 370 | +1.00% |
| 2017 | 355 | −0.82% |
| 2023 | 329 | −1.26% |
Source: INSEE

== See also ==
- Communes of the Aisne department
