= Essigny-le-Grand =

- Commune
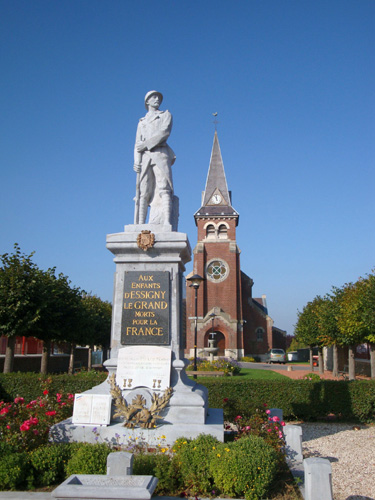
- The church and monument of Essigny-le-Grand

- Coat of arms
- Location of Essigny-le-Grand
- Location within France Location within Hauts-de-France
- Coordinates: 49°46′39″N 3°16′42″E
- Country: France
- Region: Hauts-de-France
- Department: Aisne
- Arrondissement: Saint-Quentin
- Canton: Ribemont

Government
  - Mayor (2026–32): Vincent Debailleux
- Area^{1}: 13.38 km^{2} (5.17 sq mi)
- Elevation: 93 m (305 ft)
- Highest elevation: 116 m (381 ft)
- Lowest elevation: 78 m (256 ft)
- Population (2023): 1,072
  - Density: 80.12/km^{2} (207.5/sq mi)
- Time zone: UTC+01:00 (CET)
  - Summer (DST): UTC+02:00 (CEST)
- INSEE/Postal code: 02287 /02690
- ^{1} French Land Register data, which excludes lakes, ponds, glaciers > 1 km^{2} (0.386 sq mi or 247 acres) and river estuaries.

Essigny-le-Grand (French pronunciation: [esiɲi lə ɡʁɑ̃]) is a commune in the Aisne department in Hauts-de-France in northern France.

== Population ==
Historical population
Year	Pop.	±% p.a.
1968	725	—
1975	655	−1.44%
1982	985	+6.00%
1990	1,252	+3.04%
1999	1,196	−0.51%
2007	1,135	−0.65%
2012	1,086	−0.88%
2017	1,022	−1.21%
2023	1,072	+0.80%
Source: INSEE

== See also ==
- Communes of the Aisne department
