= Châtillon-sur-Oise =

- Commune
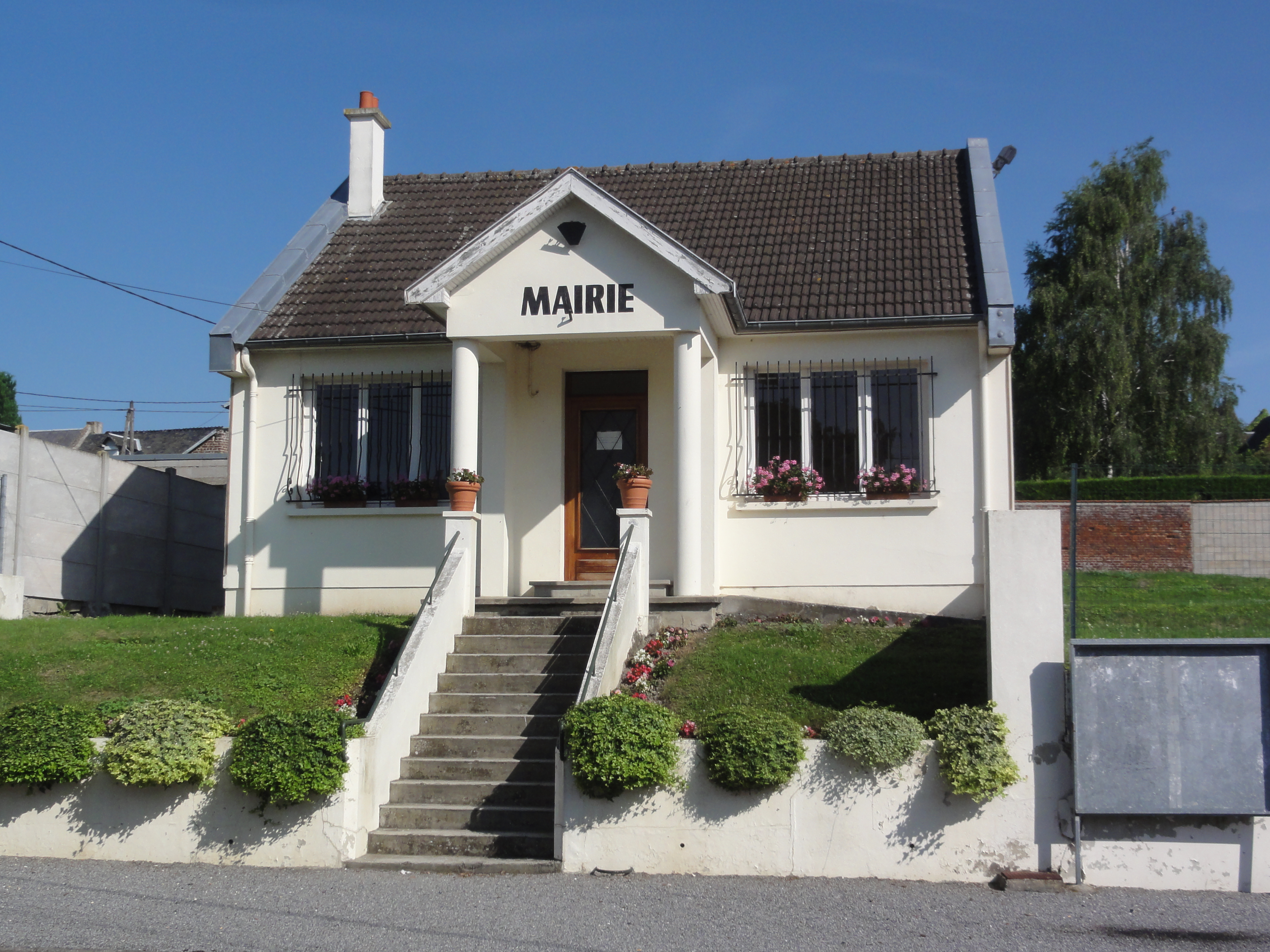
- The town hall of Châtillon-sur-Oise
- Location of Châtillon-sur-Oise
- Location within France Location within Hauts-de-France
- Coordinates: 49°47′33″N 3°25′15″E
- Country: France
- Region: Hauts-de-France
- Department: Aisne
- Arrondissement: Saint-Quentin
- Canton: Ribemont

Government
  - Mayor (2026–32): Léon Gambier
- Area^{1}: 2.62 km^{2} (1.01 sq mi)
- Elevation: 70 m (230 ft)
- Highest elevation: 119 m (390 ft)
- Lowest elevation: 61 m (200 ft)
- Population (2023): 125
  - Density: 47.7/km^{2} (124/sq mi)
- Time zone: UTC+01:00 (CET)
  - Summer (DST): UTC+02:00 (CEST)
- INSEE/Postal code: 02170 /02240
- ^{1} French Land Register data, which excludes lakes, ponds, glaciers > 1 km^{2} (0.386 sq mi or 247 acres) and river estuaries.

Châtillon-sur-Oise (French pronunciation: [ʃatijɔ̃ syʁ waz], literally Châtillon on Oise) is a commune in the Aisne department in Hauts-de-France in northern France.

== Population ==
Historical population
Year	Pop.	±% p.a.
1968	181	—
1975	119	−5.82%
1982	121	+0.24%
1990	139	+1.75%
1999	128	−0.91%
2007	141	+1.22%
2012	124	−2.54%
2017	127	+0.48%
2023	125	−0.26%
Source: INSEE

== See also ==
- Communes of the Aisne department
