= Gibercourt =

- Commune
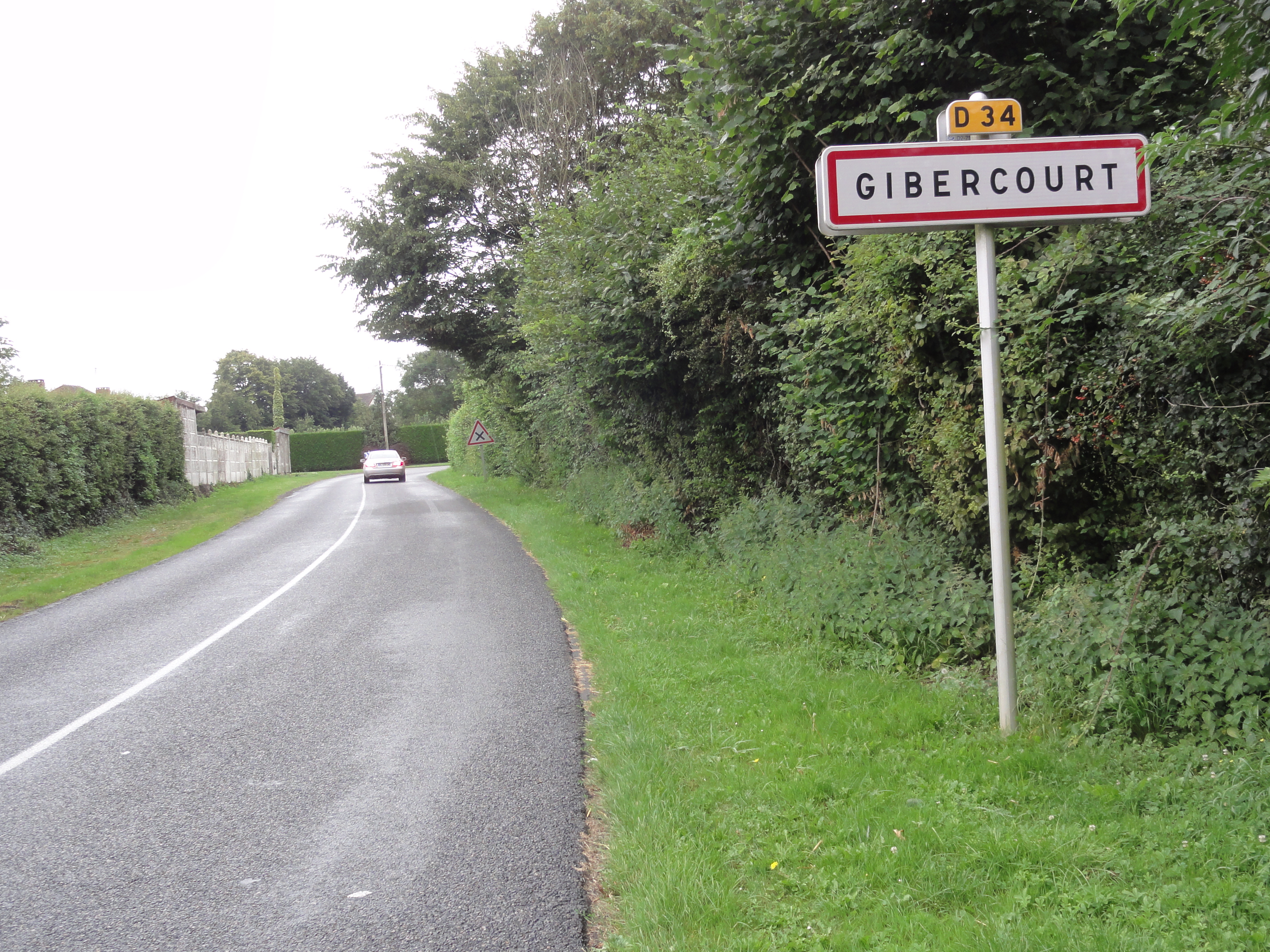
- The road into Gibercourt
- Location of Gibercourt
- Location within France Location within Hauts-de-France
- Coordinates: 49°44′15″N 3°17′07″E
- Country: France
- Region: Hauts-de-France
- Department: Aisne
- Arrondissement: Saint-Quentin
- Canton: Ribemont

Government
  - Mayor (2026–32): Michel Nuttens
- Area^{1}: 2.69 km^{2} (1.04 sq mi)
- Highest elevation: 106 m (348 ft)
- Lowest elevation: 79 m (259 ft)
- Population (2023): 37
  - Density: 14/km^{2} (36/sq mi)
- Time zone: UTC+01:00 (CET)
  - Summer (DST): UTC+02:00 (CEST)
- INSEE/Postal code: 02345 /02440
- ^{1} French Land Register data, which excludes lakes, ponds, glaciers > 1 km^{2} (0.386 sq mi or 247 acres) and river estuaries.

Gibercourt (French pronunciation: [ʒibɛʁkuʁ]) is a commune in the Aisne department in Hauts-de-France in northern France.

== Population ==
Historical population
| Year | Pop. | ±% p.a. |
|---|---|---|
| 1968 | 46 | — |
| 1975 | 39 | −2.33% |
| 1982 | 37 | −0.75% |
| 1990 | 33 | −1.42% |
| 1999 | 37 | +1.28% |
| 2007 | 43 | +1.90% |
| 2012 | 46 | +1.36% |
| 2017 | 42 | −1.80% |
| 2023 | 37 | −2.09% |
Source: INSEE

== See also ==
- Communes of the Aisne department
