= Cerizy =

- Commune
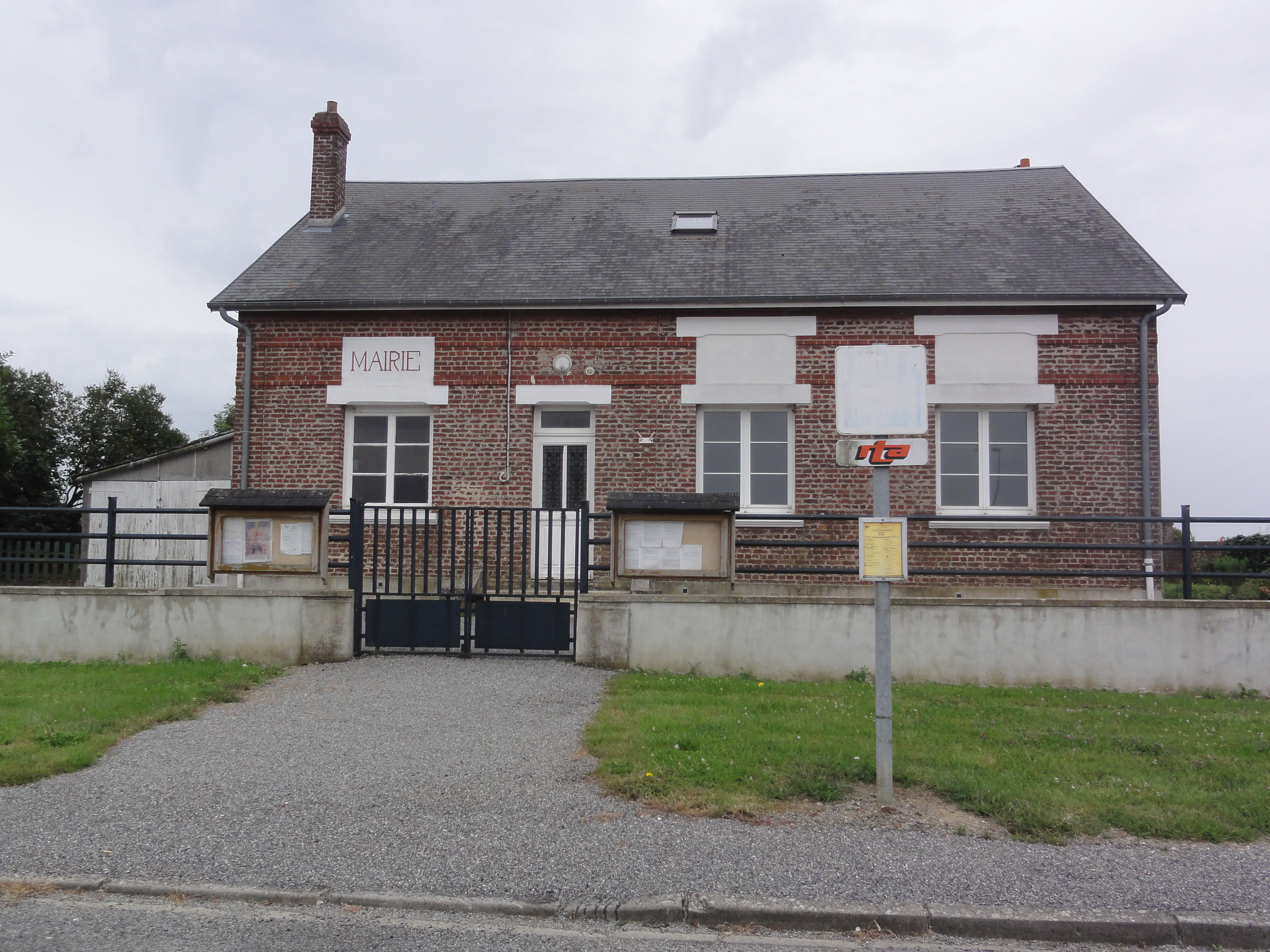
- The town hall of Cerizy
- Location of Cerizy
- Location within France Location within Hauts-de-France
- Coordinates: 49°45′39″N 3°19′40″E
- Country: France
- Region: Hauts-de-France
- Department: Aisne
- Arrondissement: Saint-Quentin
- Canton: Ribemont
- Intercommunality: Val de l'Oise

Government
  - Mayor (2026–32): Jean-Christophe Carlier
- Area^{1}: 4 km^{2} (1.5 sq mi)
- Elevation: 108 m (354 ft)
- Highest elevation: 123 m (404 ft)
- Lowest elevation: 73 m (240 ft)
- Population (2023): 58
  - Density: 14/km^{2} (38/sq mi)
- Time zone: UTC+01:00 (CET)
  - Summer (DST): UTC+02:00 (CEST)
- INSEE/Postal code: 02149 /02240
- ^{1} French Land Register data, which excludes lakes, ponds, glaciers > 1 km^{2} (0.386 sq mi or 247 acres) and river estuaries.

Cerizy (French pronunciation: [səʁizi]) is a commune in the Aisne department in Hauts-de-France in northern France. It is part of the Canton of Ribemont.

During the Retreat from Mons on 28 August 1914, the British 12th Lancers charged a dismounted Prussian Guard Dragoon regiment near the village.

== Population ==
Historical population
Year	Pop.	±% p.a.
1968	84	—
1975	86	+0.34%
1982	62	−4.57%
1990	64	+0.40%
1999	48	−3.15%
2007	58	+2.39%
2012	64	+1.99%
2017	67	+0.92%
2023	58	−2.38%
Source: INSEE

== See also ==
- Communes of the Aisne department
