= Pleine-Selve, Aisne =

Pleine-Selve
- Commune
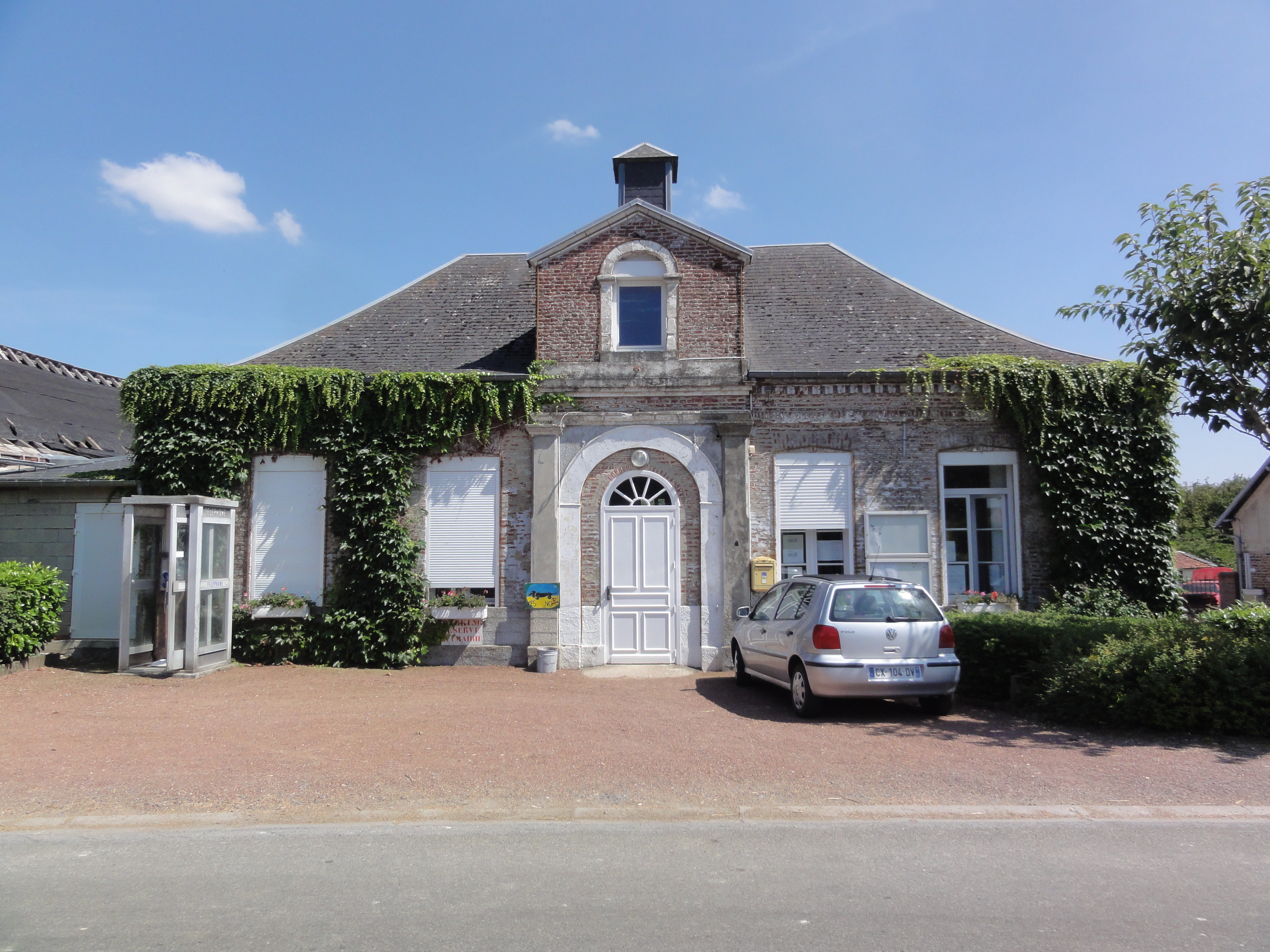
- The town hall of Pleine-Selve
- Location of Pleine-Selve
- Location within France Location within Hauts-de-France
- Coordinates: 49°47′30″N 3°31′41″E
- Country: France
- Region: Hauts-de-France
- Department: Aisne
- Arrondissement: Saint-Quentin
- Canton: Ribemont
- Intercommunality: Val de l'Oise

Government
  - Mayor (2026–32): Pierre-Luc Crapier
- Area^{1}: 6.05 km^{2} (2.34 sq mi)
- Elevation: 121 m (397 ft)
- Highest elevation: 144 m (472 ft)
- Lowest elevation: 79 m (259 ft)
- Population (2023): 186
  - Density: 30.7/km^{2} (79.6/sq mi)
- Time zone: UTC+01:00 (CET)
  - Summer (DST): UTC+02:00 (CEST)
- INSEE/Postal code: 02605 /02240
- ^{1} French Land Register data, which excludes lakes, ponds, glaciers > 1 km^{2} (0.386 sq mi or 247 acres) and river estuaries.

Pleine-Selve (French pronunciation: [plɛn sɛlv]) is a commune in the Aisne department in Hauts-de-France in northern France.

== Population ==
Historical population
Year	Pop.	±% p.a.
1968	222	—
1975	175	−3.34%
1982	149	−2.27%
1990	187	+2.88%
1999	179	−0.48%
2007	167	−0.86%
2012	175	+0.94%
2017	172	−0.35%
2023	186	+1.31%
Source: INSEE

== See also ==
- Communes of the Aisne department
