= Benay =

- Commune
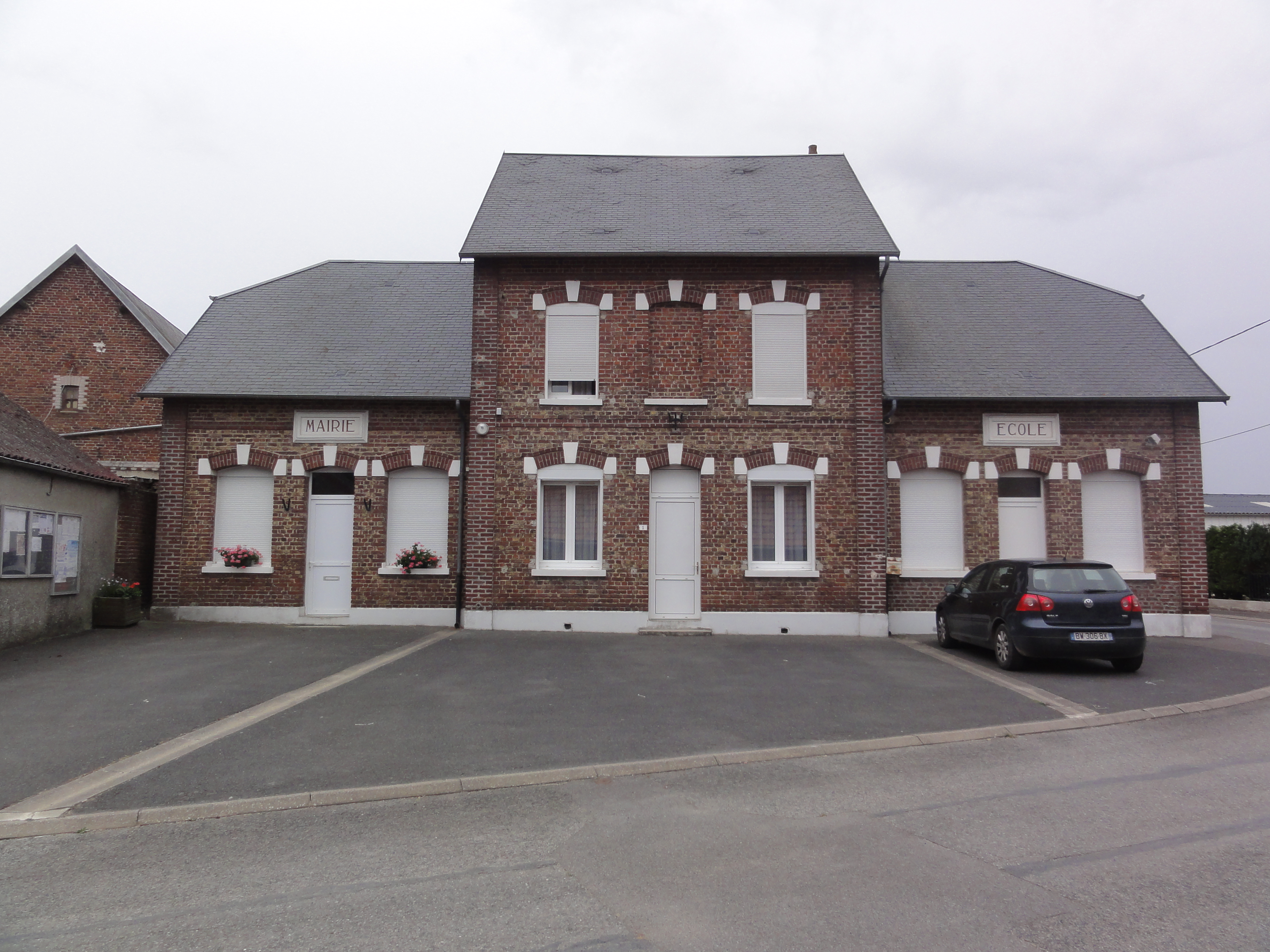
- Town hall
- Location of Benay
- Location within France Location within Hauts-de-France
- Coordinates: 49°45′37″N 3°18′20″E
- Country: France
- Region: Hauts-de-France
- Department: Aisne
- Arrondissement: Saint-Quentin
- Canton: Ribemont
- Intercommunality: Val de l'Oise

Government
  - Mayor (2026–32): Jacques Masson
- Area^{1}: 6.81 km^{2} (2.63 sq mi)
- Elevation: 105 m (344 ft)
- Highest elevation: 126 m (413 ft)
- Lowest elevation: 63 m (207 ft)
- Population (2023): 191
  - Density: 28.0/km^{2} (72.6/sq mi)
- Time zone: UTC+01:00 (CET)
  - Summer (DST): UTC+02:00 (CEST)
- INSEE/Postal code: 02066 /02440
- ^{1} French Land Register data, which excludes lakes, ponds, glaciers > 1 km^{2} (0.386 sq mi or 247 acres) and river estuaries.

Benay (French pronunciation: [bənɛ]) is a commune in the department of Aisne in Hauts-de-France in northern France.

== Population ==
Historical population
Year	Pop.	±% p.a.
1968	192	—
1975	214	+1.56%
1982	222	+0.53%
1990	206	−0.93%
1999	187	−1.07%
2007	203	+1.03%
2012	213	+0.97%
2017	204	−0.86%
2023	191	−1.09%
Source: INSEE

== See also ==
- Communes of the Aisne department
