= La Ferté-Chevresis =

- Commune
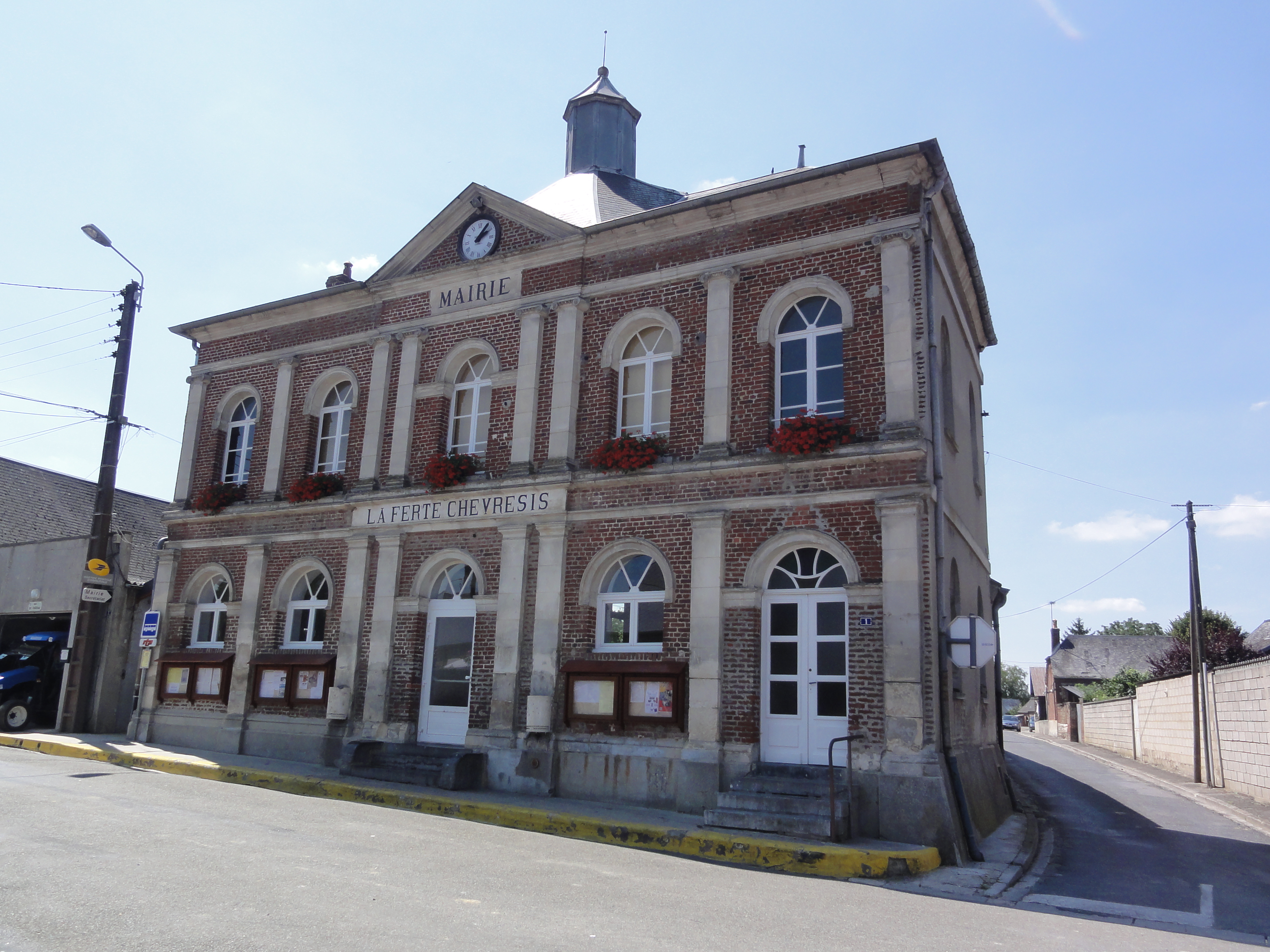
- The town hall of La Ferté-Chevresis
- Location of La Ferté-Chevresis
- Location within France Location within Hauts-de-France
- Coordinates: 49°44′15″N 3°33′31″E
- Country: France
- Region: Hauts-de-France
- Department: Aisne
- Arrondissement: Saint-Quentin
- Canton: Ribemont
- Intercommunality: Val de l'Oise

Government
  - Mayor (2026–32): Frank Burton
- Area^{1}: 23.92 km^{2} (9.24 sq mi)
- Elevation: 63 m (207 ft)
- Highest elevation: 131 m (430 ft)
- Lowest elevation: 56 m (184 ft)
- Population (2023): 526
  - Density: 22.0/km^{2} (57.0/sq mi)
- Time zone: UTC+01:00 (CET)
  - Summer (DST): UTC+02:00 (CEST)
- INSEE/Postal code: 02306 /02270
- ^{1} French Land Register data, which excludes lakes, ponds, glaciers > 1 km^{2} (0.386 sq mi or 247 acres) and river estuaries.

La Ferté-Chevresis (French pronunciation: [la fɛʁte ʃəvʁəzi]) is a commune in the Aisne department in Hauts-de-France in northern France.

== Population ==
Historical population
Year	Pop.	±% p.a.
1968	830	—
1975	714	−2.13%
1982	665	−1.01%
1990	626	−0.75%
1999	567	−1.09%
2007	590	+0.50%
2012	582	−0.27%
2017	542	−1.41%
2023	526	−0.50%
Source: INSEE

== See also ==
- Communes of the Aisne department
