= Remigny, Aisne =

Remigny
- Commune
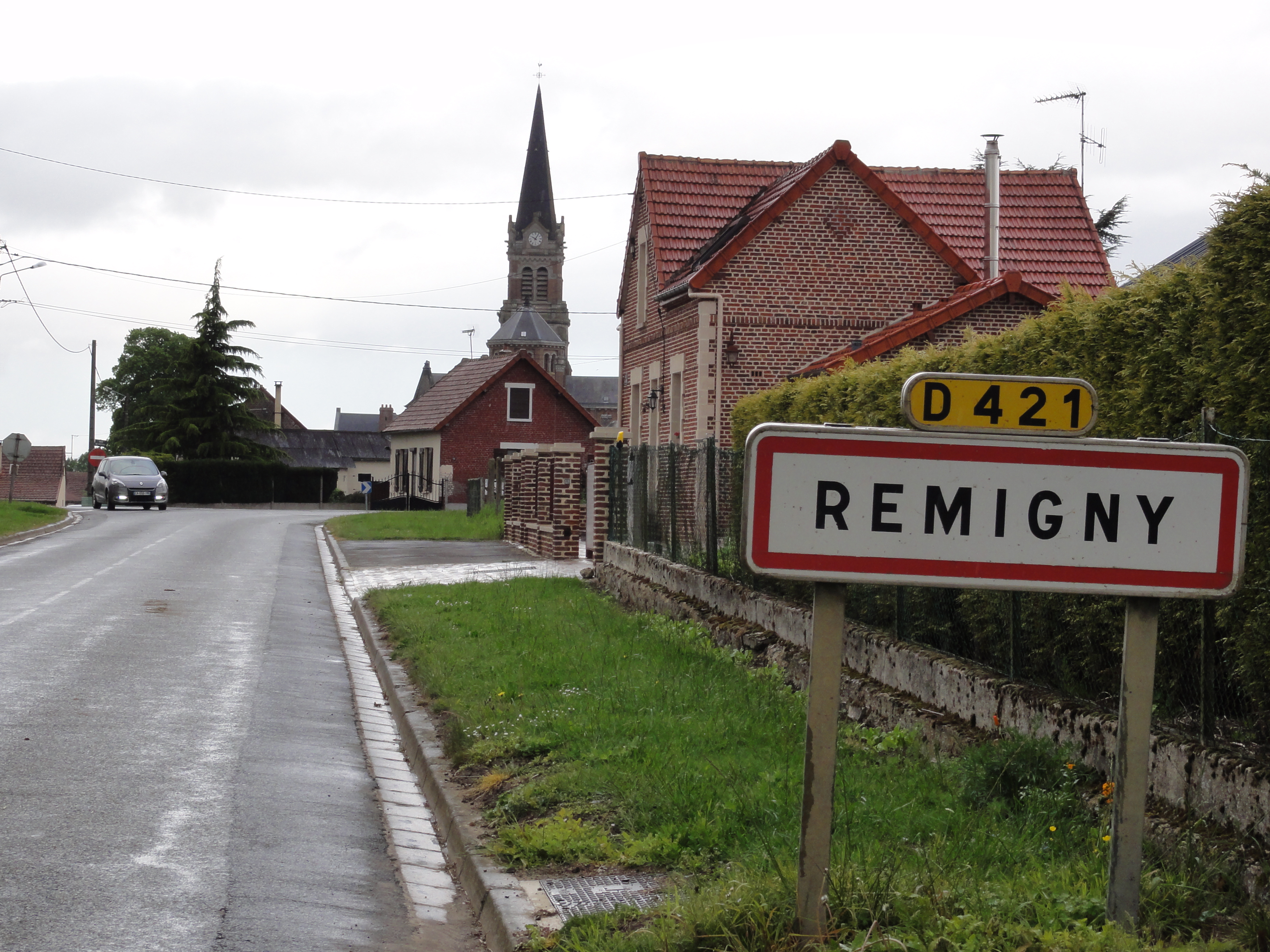
- The road into Remigny

- Coat of arms
- Location of Remigny
- Location within France Location within Hauts-de-France
- Coordinates: 49°43′13″N 3°17′22″E
- Country: France
- Region: Hauts-de-France
- Department: Aisne
- Arrondissement: Saint-Quentin
- Canton: Ribemont

Government
  - Mayor (2026–32): Marceau Lemahieu
- Area^{1}: 10.07 km^{2} (3.89 sq mi)
- Elevation: 105 m (344 ft)
- Highest elevation: 105 m (344 ft)
- Lowest elevation: 59 m (194 ft)
- Population (2023): 339
  - Density: 33.7/km^{2} (87.2/sq mi)
- Time zone: UTC+01:00 (CET)
  - Summer (DST): UTC+02:00 (CEST)
- INSEE/Postal code: 02639 /02440
- ^{1} French Land Register data, which excludes lakes, ponds, glaciers > 1 km^{2} (0.386 sq mi or 247 acres) and river estuaries.

Remigny (French pronunciation: [ʁəmiɲi]) is a commune in the Aisne department in Hauts-de-France in northern France.

== Population ==
Historical population
Year	Pop.	±% p.a.
1968	368	—
1975	329	−1.59%
1982	344	+0.64%
1990	360	+0.57%
1999	369	+0.27%
2007	347	−0.77%
2012	396	+2.68%
2017	351	−2.38%
2023	339	−0.58%
Source: INSEE

== See also ==
- Communes of the Aisne department
