= Renansart =

- Commune
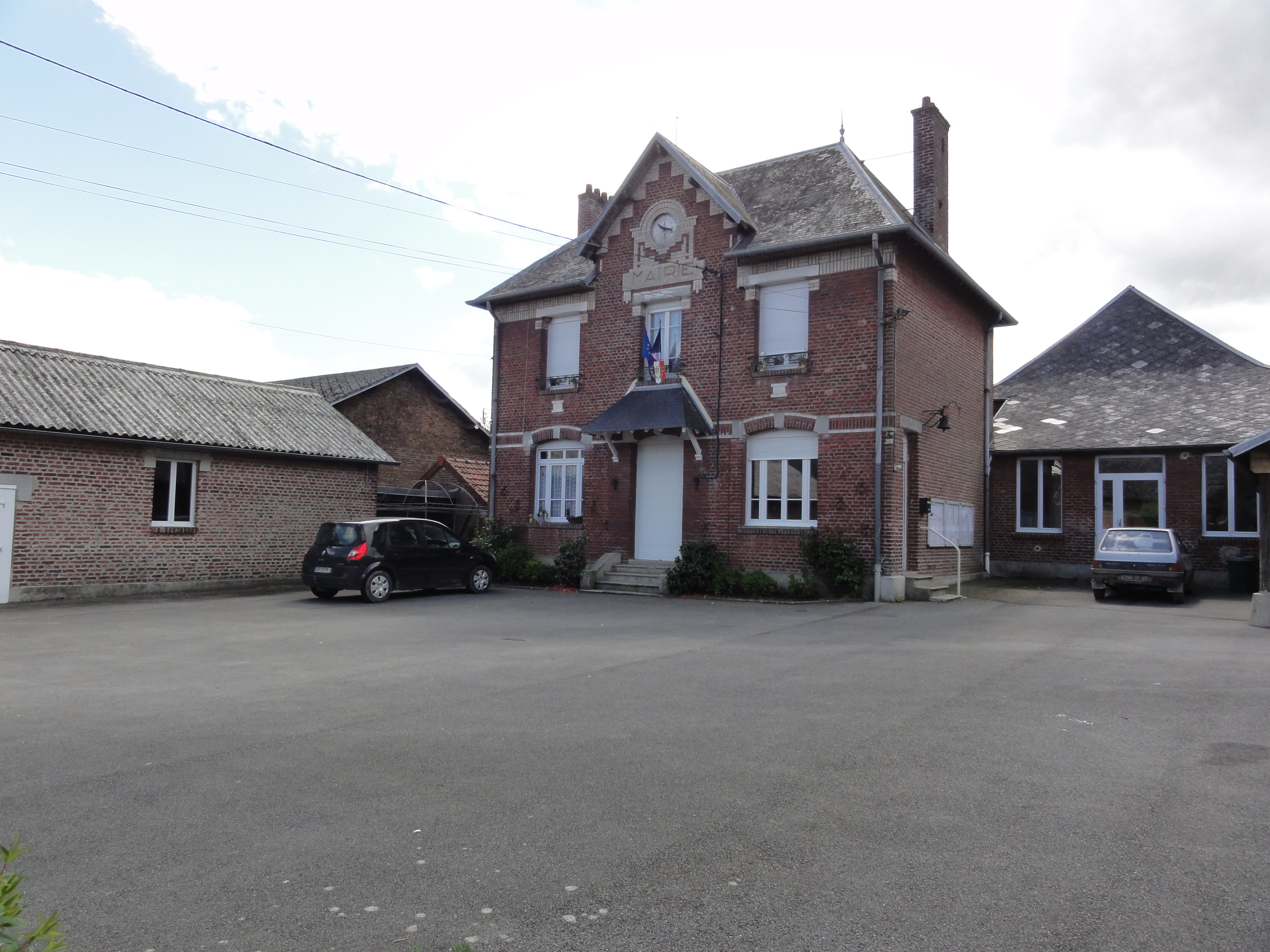
- The town hall of Renansart

- Coat of arms
- Location of Renansart
- Location within France Location within Hauts-de-France
- Coordinates: 49°44′03″N 3°27′55″E
- Country: France
- Region: Hauts-de-France
- Department: Aisne
- Arrondissement: Saint-Quentin
- Canton: Ribemont

Government
  - Mayor (2026–32): Christian Pollin
- Area^{1}: 8.71 km^{2} (3.36 sq mi)
- Elevation: 130 m (430 ft)
- Highest elevation: 126 m (413 ft)
- Lowest elevation: 76 m (249 ft)
- Population (2023): 144
  - Density: 16.5/km^{2} (42.8/sq mi)
- Time zone: UTC+01:00 (CET)
  - Summer (DST): UTC+02:00 (CEST)
- INSEE/Postal code: 02640 /02240
- ^{1} French Land Register data, which excludes lakes, ponds, glaciers > 1 km^{2} (0.386 sq mi or 247 acres) and river estuaries.

Renansart (French pronunciation: [ʁənɑ̃saʁ]) is a commune in the Aisne department in Hauts-de-France in northern France.

== Population ==
Historical population
Year	Pop.	±% p.a.
1968	192	—
1975	191	−0.07%
1982	192	+0.07%
1990	175	−1.15%
1999	176	+0.06%
2007	172	−0.29%
2012	170	−0.23%
2017	164	−0.72%
2023	144	−2.14%
Source: INSEE

== See also ==
- Communes of the Aisne department
