= Brissay-Choigny =

- Commune
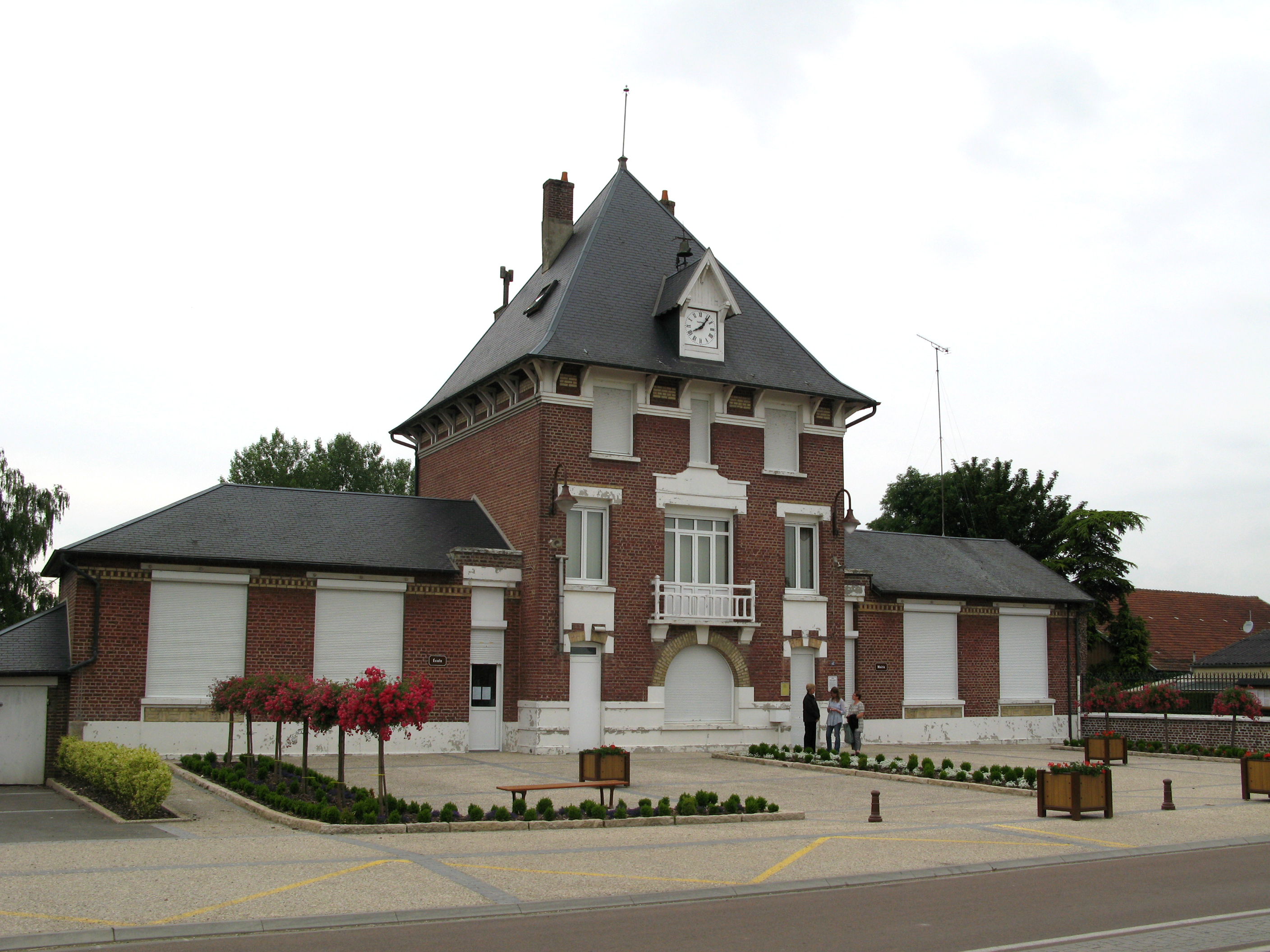
- Town hall
- Location of Brissay-Choigny
- Location within France Location within Hauts-de-France
- Coordinates: 49°43′17″N 3°22′44″E
- Country: France
- Region: Hauts-de-France
- Department: Aisne
- Arrondissement: Saint-Quentin
- Canton: Ribemont

Government
  - Mayor (2026–32): Anthony Glasset
- Area^{1}: 8.98 km^{2} (3.47 sq mi)
- Elevation: 76 m (249 ft)
- Highest elevation: 113 m (371 ft)
- Lowest elevation: 52 m (171 ft)
- Population (2023): 296
  - Density: 33.0/km^{2} (85.4/sq mi)
- Time zone: UTC+01:00 (CET)
  - Summer (DST): UTC+02:00 (CEST)
- INSEE/Postal code: 02123 /02240
- ^{1} French Land Register data, which excludes lakes, ponds, glaciers > 1 km^{2} (0.386 sq mi or 247 acres) and river estuaries.

Brissay-Choigny (French pronunciation: [bʁisɛ ʃwaɲi]) is a commune in the department of Aisne in Hauts-de-France in northern France.

== Population ==
Historical population
Year	Pop.	±% p.a.
1968	354	—
1975	324	−1.26%
1982	340	+0.69%
1990	318	−0.83%
1999	301	−0.61%
2007	320	+0.77%
2012	298	−1.41%
2017	303	+0.33%
2023	296	−0.39%
Source: INSEE

== See also ==
- Communes of the Aisne department
