= Moÿ-de-l'Aisne =

- Commune
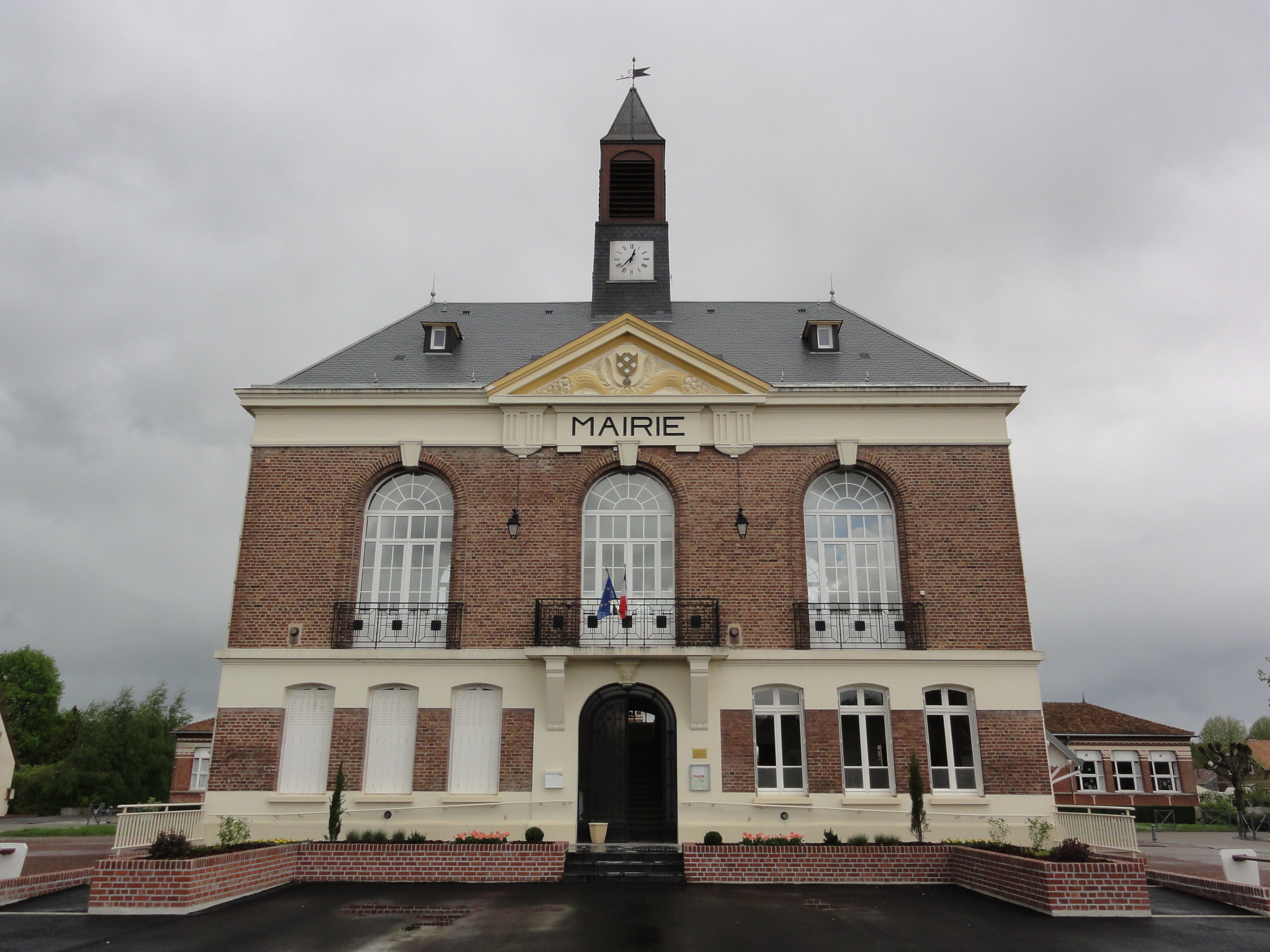
- The town hall of Moÿ-de-l'Aisne

- Coat of arms
- Location of Moÿ-de-l'Aisne
- Location within France Location within Hauts-de-France
- Coordinates: 49°45′12″N 3°21′48″E
- Country: France
- Region: Hauts-de-France
- Department: Aisne
- Arrondissement: Saint-Quentin
- Canton: Ribemont
- Intercommunality: Val de l'Oise

Government
  - Mayor (2026–32): Yves Thiebaut
- Area^{1}: 6.26 km^{2} (2.42 sq mi)
- Elevation: 59 m (194 ft)
- Highest elevation: 112 m (367 ft)
- Lowest elevation: 53 m (174 ft)
- Population (2023): 994
  - Density: 159/km^{2} (411/sq mi)
- Time zone: UTC+01:00 (CET)
  - Summer (DST): UTC+02:00 (CEST)
- INSEE/Postal code: 02532 /02610
- ^{1} French Land Register data, which excludes lakes, ponds, glaciers > 1 km^{2} (0.386 sq mi or 247 acres) and river estuaries.

Moÿ-de-l'Aisne (French pronunciation: [mɔ.i d(ə) lɛːn]; Picard: Mwi-ed-l'Ainne) is a commune in the Aisne department in Hauts-de-France in northern France.

== Demographics ==
Historical population
Year	Pop.	±% p.a.
1968	1,154	—
1975	1,126	−0.35%
1982	1,068	−0.75%
1990	1,017	−0.61%
1999	1,002	−0.16%
2007	996	−0.08%
2012	978	−0.36%
2017	975	−0.06%
2023	994	+0.32%
Source: INSEE

== See also ==
- Communes of the Aisne department
