= Mézières-sur-Oise =

- Commune
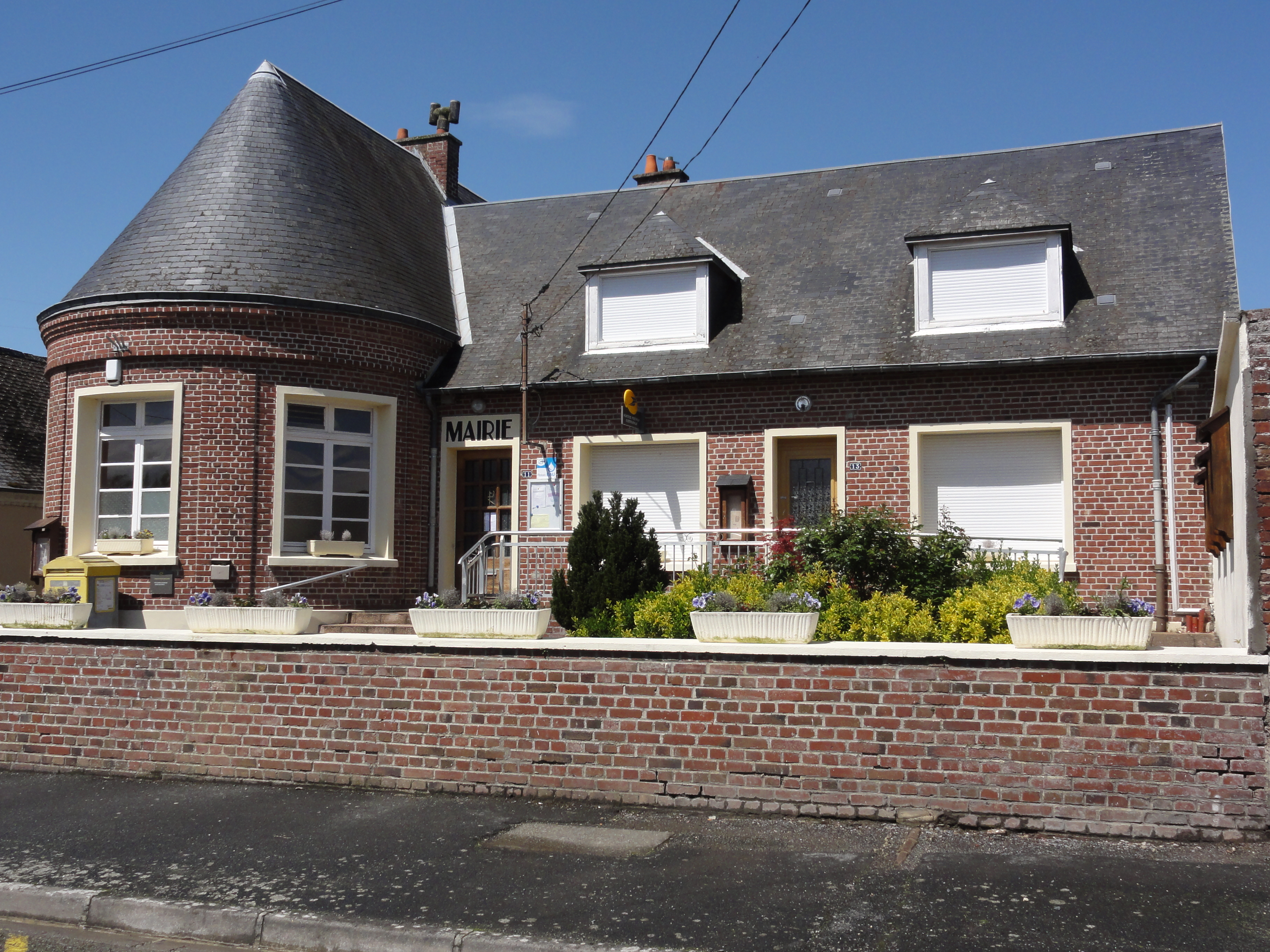
- The town hall of Mézières-sur-Oise

- Coat of arms
- Location of Mézières-sur-Oise
- Location within France Location within Hauts-de-France
- Coordinates: 49°47′02″N 3°24′01″E
- Country: France
- Region: Hauts-de-France
- Department: Aisne
- Arrondissement: Saint-Quentin
- Canton: Ribemont

Government
  - Mayor (2026–32): Isabelle Pollart
- Area^{1}: 9.59 km^{2} (3.70 sq mi)
- Elevation: 63 m (207 ft)
- Highest elevation: 118 m (387 ft)
- Lowest elevation: 58 m (190 ft)
- Population (2023): 507
  - Density: 52.9/km^{2} (137/sq mi)
- Time zone: UTC+01:00 (CET)
  - Summer (DST): UTC+02:00 (CEST)
- INSEE/Postal code: 02483 /02240
- ^{1} French Land Register data, which excludes lakes, ponds, glaciers > 1 km^{2} (0.386 sq mi or 247 acres) and river estuaries.

Mézières-sur-Oise (French pronunciation: [mezjɛʁ syʁ waz], literally Mézières on Oise) is a commune in the Aisne department in Hauts-de-France in northern France.

== Population ==
Historical population
Year	Pop.	±% p.a.
1968	525	—
1975	649	+3.08%
1982	603	−1.04%
1990	569	−0.72%
1999	567	−0.04%
2007	527	−0.91%
2012	540	+0.49%
2017	516	−0.91%
2023	507	−0.29%
Source: INSEE

== See also ==
- Communes of the Aisne department
