= Canton of Vermand =

Coordinates: 49°52′39″N 3°09′04″E

Vermand
- Former canton
- Interactive map of Vermand
- Country: France
- Region: Hauts-de-France
- Department: Aisne
- No. of communes: {{{nbcomm}}}
- Disbanded: 2015
- Area: 167.30 km^{2} (64.59 sq mi)
- Population (2012): 9,663
  - Density: 57.76/km^{2} (149.6/sq mi)

The canton of Vermand is a former administrative division in northern France. It was disbanded following the French canton reorganisation which came into effect in March 2015. It consisted of 24 communes, which joined the new canton of Saint-Quentin-1 in 2015. It had 9,663 inhabitants (2012).

The canton comprised the following communes:

- Attilly
- Beauvois-en-Vermandois
- Caulaincourt
- Douchy
- Étreillers
- Fayet
- Fluquières
- Foreste
- Francilly-Selency
- Germaine
- Gricourt
- Holnon
- Jeancourt
- Lanchy
- Maissemy
- Pontru
- Pontruet
- Roupy
- Savy
- Trefcon
- Vaux-en-Vermandois
- Vendelles
- Le Verguier
- Vermand

== Demographics ==
Historical population Canton of Vermand
Year	1962	1968	1975	1982	1990	1999	2006
Pop.	7,294	7,312	8,735	8,948	9,134	9,312	9,334
±%	—	+0.2%	+19.5%	+2.4%	+2.1%	+1.9%	+0.2%
From the year 1962 on: No double counting – residents of multiple communes (e.g. students and military personnel) are counted only once. Source: INSEE

== See also ==
- Cantons of the Aisne department
- Communes of France
