= 89th Brigade (United Kingdom) =

- Active: 19 November 1914–10 April 1915; 27 April 1915–1 September 1919
- Allegiance: United Kingdom
- Branch: New Army
- Type: Infantry
- Size: Brigade
- Part of: 30th Division
- Nickname: Liverpool Pals Brigade
- Engagements: Capture of Montauban; Battle of the Somme; Battle of Arras; Battle of Pilckem Ridge; German spring offensive Hundred Days Offensive

The 89th Brigade was an infantry formation of the British Army during World War I. It was raised as part of 'Kitchener's Army' and was assigned to the 30th Division. After the original formation was converted into a reserve brigade, the number was transferred to the Earl of Derby's brigade of 'Liverpool Pals'. The brigade landed in France at the end of 1915 and then served on the Western Front for the rest of the war, seeing action at the Somme, Arras, and Ypres. Virtually destroyed during the German spring offensive of 1918, it was reconstituted in time to take part in the final battles of the war.

== Original 89th Brigade ==
Alfred Leete's recruitment poster for Kitchener's Army.

On 6 August 1914, less than 48 hours after Britain's declaration of war, Parliament sanctioned an increase of 500,000 men for the Regular British Army. The newly appointed Secretary of State for War, Earl Kitchener of Khartoum, issued his famous call to arms: 'Your King and Country Need You', urging the first 100,000 volunteers to come forward. This group of six divisions with supporting arms became known as Kitchener's First New Army, or 'K1'. The K2 and K3 battalions, brigades and divisions followed soon afterwards. So far, the battalions had all been formed at the depots of their parent regiments, but recruits had also been flooding in to the Special Reserve (SR) battalions (the former Militia). These were deployed at their war stations in coastal defence where they were training and equipping reservists to provide reinforcement drafts to the Regular Army fighting overseas. The SR battalions were soon well above their establishment strength and on 8 October 1914 the War Office (WO) ordered each SR battalion to use the surplus to form a service battalion of the 4th New Army ('K4'). In November K4 battalions were organised into 18 brigades numbered from 89 to 106 and formed into the 30th–35th Divisions.

Initially, the K4 units remained in the coast defences alongside their parent SR battalions. On 19 November 1914 the composition of 89th Brigade in 30th Division was finalised as:

- 15th (Service) Battalion, Northumberland Fusiliers, formed at Darlington
- 11th (Service) Battalion, Green Howards, formed at West Hartlepool
- 16th (Service) Battalion, Durham Light Infantry, formed at Durham
- 17th (Service) Battalion, Durham Light Infantry, formed at Barnard Castle

The brigade concentrated at Darlington, and on 4 December Brigadier-General H.P. Leach was appointed to command it. The units began training for active service, but the lack of uniforms, weapons, equipment and instructors that had been experienced by the K1–K3 units was even greater for those of K4, and by April 1915 their training was still at an elementary stage. On 10 April 1915 the War Office decided to convert the K4 battalions into reserve units, to provide drafts for the K1–K3 battalions in the same way that the SR was doing for the Regular battalions. The K4 divisions were broken up and the brigades were renumbered: 89th Brigade became 1st Reserve Brigade.

== New 89th Brigade ==
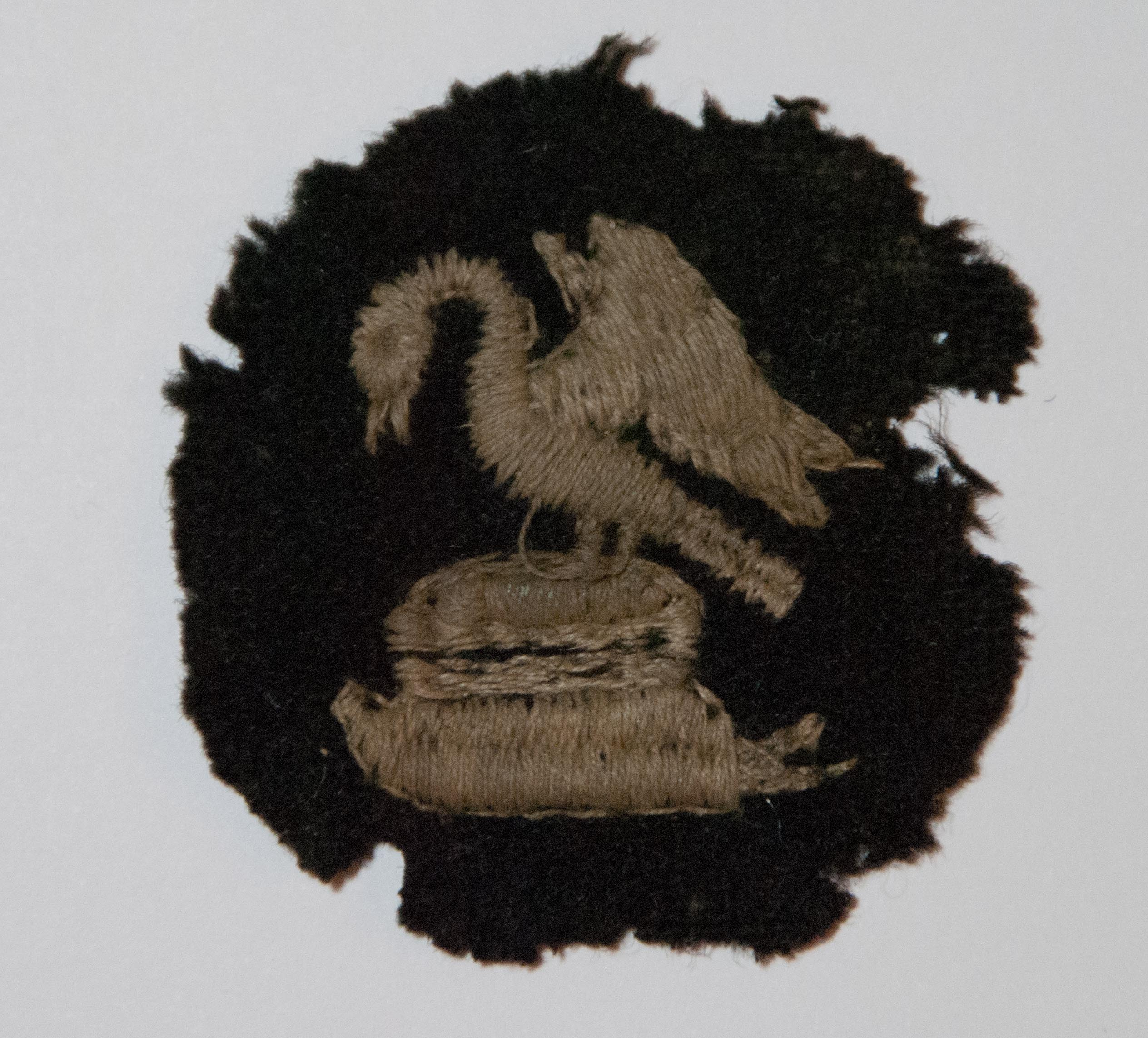
Formation sign of the 30th Division, based on the Earl of Derby's family crest.

Meanwhile, the K5 units had been forming since late 1914. These were largely raised by local initiative rather than at regimental depots, and were known as 'Pals battalions'. The first six K5 divisions (37–42) and their constituent brigades were given the numbers of the disbanded K4 formations on 27 April 1915. Thus 110th Brigade of 37th Division became the new 89th Brigade in 30th Division. This division had been raised largely by Edward Stanley, 17th Earl of Derby from the cities of Liverpool and Manchester, and was sometimes known as 'Lord Derby's Own', or more disparagingly as the 'Derby Family Retainers'. The divisional sign was based on the Stanley family crest, and two of the earl's brothers served in it, including the Hon Ferdinand Charles Stanley, who commanded 89th Brigade. The brigade's original infantry units were 'Liverpool Pals' battalions, which had been recruited by the Earl of Derby after a meeting at the Old Watch Factory in Prescot on 29 August 1914, the first 'local' battalions to be formed and thus the senior units of K5:

- 17th (Service) Battalion, King's (Liverpool Regiment) (1st City)
- 18th (Service) Battalion, King's (Liverpool Regiment) (2nd City)
- 19th (Service) Battalion, King's (Liverpool Regiment) (3rd City)
- 20th (Service) Battalion, King's (Liverpool Regiment) (4th City)

After initial training at the Earl of Derby's estate at Knowsley Park, the brigade moved to Belton Park outside Grantham soon after it was renumbered. Training was hampered by the same lack of equipment as the other Kitchener units, but on 14 September 1915 30th Division moved to Larkhill on Salisbury Plain for final battle training. On 31 October it was ordered to France to join the British Expeditionary Force (BEF) fighting on the Western Front. Before leaving it was inspected by the Earl of Derby. It began entraining for the embarkation ports on 6 November and on 12 November it completed its concentration at Ailly-le-Haut-Clocher in the Somme sector.

BEF policy was to even up the experience between its New Army and Regular Army formations by exchanging brigades and then distributing the experienced Regular battalions through the New Army divisions. In this way 21st Brigade from 7th Division replaced 91st Brigade in 30th Division on its arrival in France, and on 25 December it exchanged 2nd Battalion, Bedfordshire Regiment, for 18th King's in 89th Bde. 30th Division was part of the concentration of forces preparing for the 'Big Push' of 1916, the Battle of the Somme. Before the battle 89th Bde was joined by its integral support units:

- 89th Brigade Machine Gun (MG) Company, disembarked at Le Havre on 11 March 1916 and joined the brigade at Sailly-Laurette on 13 March.
- 89th Trench Mortar Battery (TMB), formed by 16 June 1916 from:
  - 89/1 Bty formed by 15 March 1916
  - 89/2 Bty formed 12 April 1916

=== First day on the Somme ===
For its first offensive action, 30th Division formed the extreme right of the BEF and was to attack alongside the French Army; its task was the Capture of Montauban. After a seven-day bombardment, the attack went in at 07.30 on 1 July 1916. 89th Brigade, with 17th and 20th King's leading, set off from their four lines of assembly trenches. They advanced in quick time, with rifles slung, over the 500 yards (460 m) of No man's land, finding the barbed wire well cut by the bombardment. To ensure good liaison, Lieutenant-Colonel B.C. Fairfax of 17th King's and Commandant Le Petit of the neighbouring 3rd Battalion, 135th French Infantry Regiment, stepped over the parapet together as the second wave advanced, and they went forward arm-in-arm. The companies of the last wave advanced ahead of schedule, and thereby missed the German counter-bombardment that came down on their assembly trenches a few minutes later. The German defenders were not out of their dugouts in time to man their front trench, and about 300 were captured in the dugouts by 2nd Bedfords, 'mopping up' behind the leading battalions, which pressed on through 'German's Wood' to 'Casement Trench' and 'Alt Trench'. After a pause to allow the British barrage to lift (the attackers were ahead of schedule) 89th Bde pressed on to its first objective, the newly dug 'Dublin Trench' a reserve line some 700–1,000 yards (640–910 m) beyond the front. The brigade found the trench unoccupied, and the 135th French Regiment also entered 'Dublin Redoubt'. The troops began to consolidate the captured line, using picks and shovels brought up by carrying parties of the supporting battalion. In fact Dublin Trench was so battered by Allied artillery that it was unrecognisable, and in places the British dug new positions by joining up shellholes 150 yards (140 m) beyond it (which saved casualties when the Germans began shelling the original trench). In a little over an hour 30th Division had easily taken its first objective. 90th Brigade then passed through to complete the Capture of Montauban by 11.30. The division's final objective for the day was a brickworks beyond Montauban, the chimney of which was a German observation post. It was subjected to heavy artillery fire and then assaulted by No 4 Company of 20th King's, from Dublin Trench. They took the place within a few minutes, capturing a German regimental HQ. 30th Division had taken all of its objectives – one of the BEF's few successful actions on the otherwise disastrous First Day on the Somme. Although there were still 8 hours of daylight, and the division sent patrols ahead into Bernafy Wood (finding it unoccupied), it was not allowed to advance further, because the other British formations were held up. It was several days before Bernafy Wood was captured, by which time 30th Division had been relieved in the line.

Thereafter, the brigade took part in the following actions:

- Battle of the Somme
  - Capture of Trônes Wood (7–13 July)
  - Battle of the Transloy Ridges (10–18 October)

=== 1917 ===
- German retreat to the Hindenburg Line (14 March–5 April)
- Battle of Arras:
  - First Battle of the Scarpe (9–13 April)
  - Second Battle of the Scarpe (23–24 April)
- Third Battle of Ypres:
  - Battle of Pilckem Ridge (31 July–2 August)

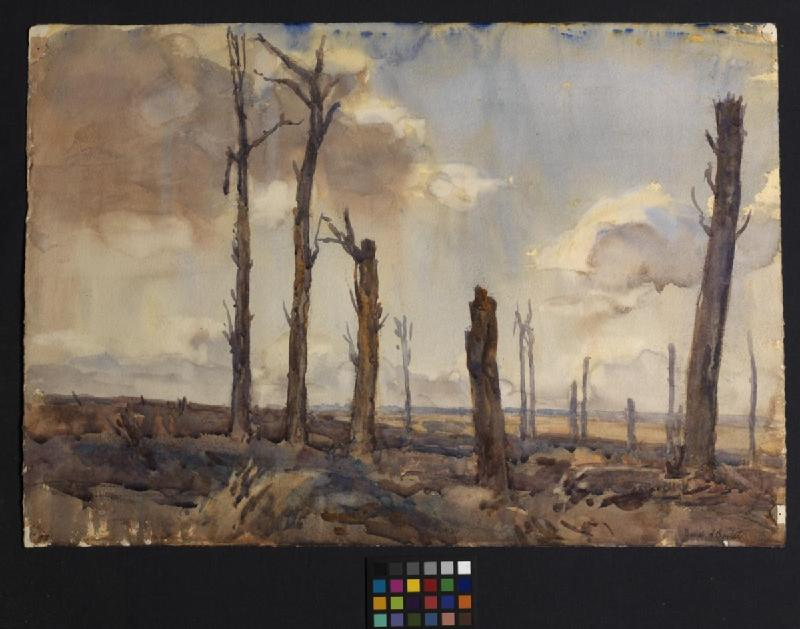
Sanctuary Wood, painted by David Baxter.

At Pilckem Ridge, the opening phase of the Ypres offensive, II Corps was given the toughest objective, the capture of the Gheluvelt Plateau. Within the corps, 30th Division had the hardest task of all, but it had not recovered from its severe losses on the Somme and at Arras. Although General Headquarters had suggested replacing it with a fresher division, this had not been done. The infantry attacked at 03.50 on 31 July 1917 behind a creeping barrage, but despite 14 days of bombardment, the Germans' rearward positions were still intact, and their guns behind the Gheluvelt Plateau remained unsuppressed. 21st and 90th Brigades made slow progress, held up by machine guns, and lost the barrage. They could not get beyond their first objective (the Blue Line). Two battalions of 89th Bde were tasked with advancing in combination with 18th (Eastern) Division on the third and fourth objectives. Learning that the second objective (the Black Line) had not been reached, part of 18th (E) Division was recalled, but the battalions of 89th Bde and two from 54th Bde had already set off. Trying to pass through the tangled fallen trees and shellholes of Sanctuary Wood and delayed by constant German shellfire, they missed the barrage, which had already lifted onto the third objective before they reached the Blue Line at 08.00. Attempts to get across the open ground beyond were unsuccessful, and casualties were heavy. The failure of 30th Division meant that the neighbouring 8th Division was also held up. By 13.30 the whole of II Corps' attack was deadlocked, and it consolidated its meagre gains. Heavy rain set in at the end of the day, effectively ending the Battle of Pilckem Ridge.

30th Division was criticised for its performance by the chief of staff of Fifth Army, and after the failure on the opening day of the Ypres offensive, 30th Division was not used for an attack again in 1917.

=== 1918 ===
By early 1918 the BEF was suffering a manpower crisis and brigades were reorganised on a three-battalion basis, the surplus units being broken up to provide reinforcements. 20th King's was disbanded on 8 February 1918 and on 11 February 2nd Bedfords transferred to 90th Bde in exchange for 18th King's (which had absorbed the personnel of 1/1st Lancashire Hussars during 1917). The brigade MG companies were grouped into a divisional battalion of the Machine Gun Corps (MGC) on 1 March 1918. These changes gave 89th Bde the following organisation:

- 17th King's (1st City)
- 18th King's (Lancashire Hussars)
- 19th King's (3rd City)
- 89th TMB

=== Spring Offensive ===
When the German spring offensive was launched on 21 March 1918, 30th Division was in the centre of XVIII Corps, holding a forward slope facing the town of St Quentin. 89th Brigade was in corps reserve, in and behind the Green (Reserve) Line, and therefore was not engaged at the start of the battle. The Germans attacked out of a morning mist after a savage bombardment, and 30th Division's outposts were soon overrun. However, a line of redoubts in the Forward Zone held out for a considerable time, and the mist had cleared by the time the Germans approached the main Battle Zone, sited on a reverse slope and supported by artillery. By nightfall the Germans had gained a footing in the defended village of Roupy, but could not take the 'Keep' in the centre. 30th Division had carried out one of the most successful defensive actions of the day. At 01.45 the following morning 19th King's from 89th Bde came up and made a counter-attack which regained some of the lost ground. Of the other two battalions of 89th Bde, one was positioned at Vaux to support the left of 30th Division, the other at Attilly in support of the neighbouring 61st (2nd South Midland) Division. During 22 March the Germans made two further attacks on Roupy, with aircraft directing the artillery. After hard fighting. they finally took the village between 14.00 and 15.00, whereupon the survivors of the garrison fell back to 'Stanley Redoubt' in a group of houses south-west of Roupy, where the battalion HQs of 19th Kings and 2nd Green Howards were situated. Here they made a stand that caused heavy casualties to the attackers, and then they broke through the encircling Germans and went back to the Green Line. However, the Green Line trenches had only been dug a few inches deep, and there were no tools or time to complete them quickly. Furthermore, the Germans had achieved substantial breakthroughs both north and south of St Quentin. That night XVIII Corps issued orders to withdraw from the Green Line to the left bank of the Somme, 30th Division passing through 20th (Light) Division which was to act as the rearguard. 89th Brigade was reassembled to hold the new divisional line on the Somme, while the rest of 30th Division went into reserve.

While his battalions were dispersed, Brig-Gen Stanley had been sent to Ham during 22 March to organise the defence of the bridgehead there. He had the 21st and 23rd Entrenching Battalions, 30th Divisional Royal Engineers (RE) and three 'Special' (gas) RE Companies, five platoons from XVIII Corps Reinforcement Camp and some of the Corps Cyclists. With these troops he had improved the trenches and wire round the town, but the position was still weak. As soon as the battalions of 89th Bde arrived about 02.00 on the morning of 23 March, these other troops were withdrawn, leaving Stanley with three weak battalions to hold a semicircular line round the town over 2 miles (3.2 km) long. The Germans attacked at dawn, covered by morning mist. For about an hour, 89th Bde held off the frontal attack, but its line did not extend back to the river, and German troops infiltrated along the riverbank from the west and installed machine guns in the brigade's rear. The three battalions withdrew through the town, fighting as best they could, many of the men being cut off near the river. A remnant managed to cross over by No 4 Bridge, which was blown up by the engineers just as the Germans gained a footing on it (the other bridges had already been damaged). Nevertheless, German infantry scrambled across the ruins. The men cut off in the town continued fighting for another two hours before they were eliminated. The survivors of 89th Bde reformed in front of Verlaines and then moved forward again to confront the Germans along the railway. By the end of the day, the Germans had gained two other crossings of the river and canal, and XVIII Corps had been forced back. Next day 90th Bde held the line, with 89th Bde (its three battalions forming a single composite battalion) in support, but the Germans were lapping round 30th Division's flank, and it continued its withdrawal soon after 10.30. Once the artillery had withdrawn, the infantry (much mixed up) crossed the Canal du Nord at Lannoy Farm. That night 90th Bde dug in along the deep canal cutting, with the other two brigades in support. Next day (25 March) the division held its ground, despite heavy shelling, but about 16.00 it began to be shelled from its right rear, while German troops who had crossed the canal further along began rolling up its line. Half an hour later it was ordered to retire through the French troops who had come up in support, though casualties were heavy during this retirement. By daybreak on 26 March what was left of 30th Division (no more than about 1000 men) was assembled 7 miles (11 km) WNW of Roye, ready with the rest of XVIII Corps to fill the gap between the French and XIX Corps. 30th Division encountered the Germans moving towards Le Quesnoy; it took up positions at Bouchoir about a mile back and covered the rearguard's retirement from Le Quesnoy. That night it formed the front line. The German attack came at 09.00 on 27 March and fighting was heavy. Owing to a misunderstanding with the French, 30th Division fell back a short way, but was able to regain its position. However, that afternoon it had to retire to conform with the rest of the corps. The enemy did not follow, but pushed past the division towards Montdidier. French troops were supposed to relieve 30th Division that night, but it was not until midday on 28 March that the survivors were allowed to fall back through the French and across the River Avre into reserve.

The exhausted 30th Division was withdrawn for rest on 29 March, but the BEF had no reinforcements available for it. In early April it was sent north to the quiet Flanders sector under Second Army. However, this was the area selected by the Germans for the second phase of the spring offensive (the Battle of the Lys), launched on 9 April. 30th Division was positioned holding the most northerly sector of the Ypres Salient, and by 12 April the pressure on Second Army was such that much of the salient had to be abandoned in order to shorten the line. 30th Division completed its move on 15 April. This freed 89th Bde to be sent on 17 April to support IX Corps, which was under attack on the southern side of the salient. Together with men of 13th Battalion, Tank Corps, operating dismounted with Lewis guns, 89th Bde relieved brigades of 25th and 34th Divisions. Next day IX Corps successfully held off attacks against Mont Kemmel and was then relieved by French troops over succeeding days; 89th Bde passed to the command of XXII Corps. However, the Germans renewed their attacks on 25 April, taking Mont Kemmel from the French and pressing back the flank of XXII Corps. The whole of 30th Division was now present, comprising 89th Bde and 21st Composite Bde, detachments of which were used to relieve frontline units of XXII Corps. When the attack developed 89th Bde was ordered up from east of Poperinge and put at the disposal of 21st Division at 14.50 to help hold the Vierstraat Line (the Support Line) to which the division was retiring. Bitter fighting continued next day, XXII Corps giving some ground. On 27 April the fighting centred on Voormezeele: 39th Division Composite Bde lost the village in the afternoon but recovered it by an immediate counter-attack. 89th Brigade was then ordered to relieve 39th Comp Bde that night, but the Germans attacked while this was being carried out, and they gained a foothold in the village. Next day Brig-Gen R.A.M. Currie of 89th Bde was given command of the whole 21st Division front from Ridge Wood to Lock 8 on the Ypres–Comines Canal. The Germans pushed along the canal and captured the lock, but Currie established a new outpost line from Voormezeele to 700 yards (640 m) north of the lock. Next day, 29 April (the Battle of the Scherpenberg), saw all three battalions of 89th Bde desperately holding this line against a heavy bombardment and infantry attack. Two companies on the left were surrounded and captured, making the Voormezeele Switch trench untenable, but 89th Bde swung back its left as far as the main line of resistance before the second infantry attack developed. This was then stopped by effective artillery fire. About 17.00 further enemy movements were slowed by rifle and machine gun fire, then stopped by the artillery. Next day the Germans called off the Lys offensive.

Given the shortage of reinforcements, not all the British divisions could be brought back to full strength, and a number (including the 30th) were selected to be reduced to cadre strength until fresh units could be brought back from the Palestine Campaign. From 2 to 11 May the remnants of all three brigades of 30th Division were formed into '30th Composite Brigade' under the command of Brig-Gen Currie of 89th Bde:

- 17th King's (with available men of 18th and 19th King's)
- 2nd Bedfords (with available men of 2nd Wiltshires)
- 2nd Green Howards (with available men of 16th and 17th Manchesters)
- 202nd (County Palatine) Field Company, Royal Engineers
- C Company, No 30 Battalion, MGC
- No 4 Company, 30th Divisional Train, Army Service Corps

In its short existence 30th Composite Bde served under the command of 49th (West Riding) and 33rd Divisions. For a while the units of 30th Division were used to train newly arrived US Army battalions. On 14 May the three battalions of 89th Bde were reduced to training cadres (consisting of 10 officers and 45 other ranks) and transferred to 66th (2nd East Lancashire) Division to continue working with the Americans. The cadre of 7th Bedfords briefly joined the brigade from 21st Bde on 15 June, but within days it had also gone to 66th Division to be absorbed by 2nd Bedfords.

== Reconstituted 89th Brigade ==
30th Division was reconstituted in late June and early July 1918, 89th Bde now having the following organisation:

- 2nd South Lancashire Regiment – joined 30 June 1918 from 21st Division
- 7th/8th Royal Inniskilling Fusiliers – joined 3 July 1918; reformed from a cadre, mainly with men from 8th Rifle Brigade
- 2/17th London Regiment (Poplar & Stepney) – joined 30 June 1918 fromPalestine
- 89th TM Bty – reformed by 10 July 1918

=== Hundred Days Offensive ===
The reconstituted 30th Division was reassigned to Second Army on the Flanders front. By the time the division was ready for action the Final Allied Advance (the Hundred Days Offensive) had begun, and Second Army was cautiously following a deliberate German retirement. On 1 September 89th Bde carried out a small operation by itself to capture Neuve Eglise. Second Army began a major offensive (the Fifth Battle of Ypres) on 28 September. 30th Division was to watch for opportunities, and it sent patrols forward. At 16.40 it was ordered to advance and complete the capture of that day's third objective. The brigades attacked at 18.30 and gained a little ground, slowed up more by broken terrain and oncoming darkness than by enemy opposition. Starting early next morning 89th Bde cleared the Messines–Wytschaete Ridge, and made rapid progress towards the Comines Canal, which it reached easily.

89th Brigade was in reserve when 30th Division attacked again at the Battle of Courtrai on 14 October. The division pushed patrols forward to the River Lys on 15 October and crossed next day. It continued its advance over the following days, using small advance guards with 89th Bde further back in support. On 21 October patrols from the brigade took over the lead as the division approached the River Schelde and occupied its west bank.

Second Army prepared an assault crossing of the Schelde timed for 11 November, but the enemy began withdrawing on 8 November and next day 89th Bde forced a crossing of the river at Avelgem. It advanced rapidly through Ansercoeuil to reach Renaix that night. The line was pushed forwards next day, and the division occupied Ellezelles, confronting the German rearguards at Flobecq, east of Renaix. On the morning of 11 November the 7th Dragoon Guards passed through the infantry, and advanced rapidly with the leading infantry of 89th Bde to reach a line from Ghoy to La Livarde, north west of Lessines when the Armistice came into force at 11.00.

Afterwards 30th Division moved back to the west and by 4 December was billeted in Renescure until the end of the month when its units moved to the base ports of Dunkirk, Calais, Boulogne and Étaples for duties there. In February demobilisation began, but 30th Division remained in existence until 1 September 1919.

89th Brigade was not reformed in World War II.

== Commanders ==
The following officers commanded 89th Bde:

- Brig-Gen Hon F.C. Stanley, from 10 December 1914; returned 25 September 1917
- Brig-Gen W.W. Norman, from 16 June 1917
- Brig-Gen W.W. Seymour, from 9 September 1917
- Lt-Col G. Rollo, acting 11 April 1918
- Brig-Gen R.A.M. Currie from 12 April 1918; returned 15 September 1918
- Lt-Col E.A. Irvine, acting from 17 August 1918

== Insignia ==
Troops of 30th Division wore the divisional sign as a cloth badge on the arm from 1918. The individual units adopted a variety of identifying flashes worn by all ranks at the top of the sleeve. In 1917 units of 89th Bde were using the following:

- 17th King's: a black rectangle worn horizontally
- 19th King's: a white rectangle worn vertically
- 20th King's: a yellow rectangle worn vertically

No details of unit flashes have been recorded for 2nd Bedfords, 89th MG Company or 89th TMB.
