= Douchy =

Douchy may refer to the following places in France:

- Douchy, Aisne, a commune in the department of Aisne
- Douchy, Loiret, a commune in the department of Loiret
- Douchy-lès-Ayette, a commune in the department of Pas-de-Calais
- Douchy-les-Mines, a commune in the department of Nord
