= Jeancourt =

- Commune
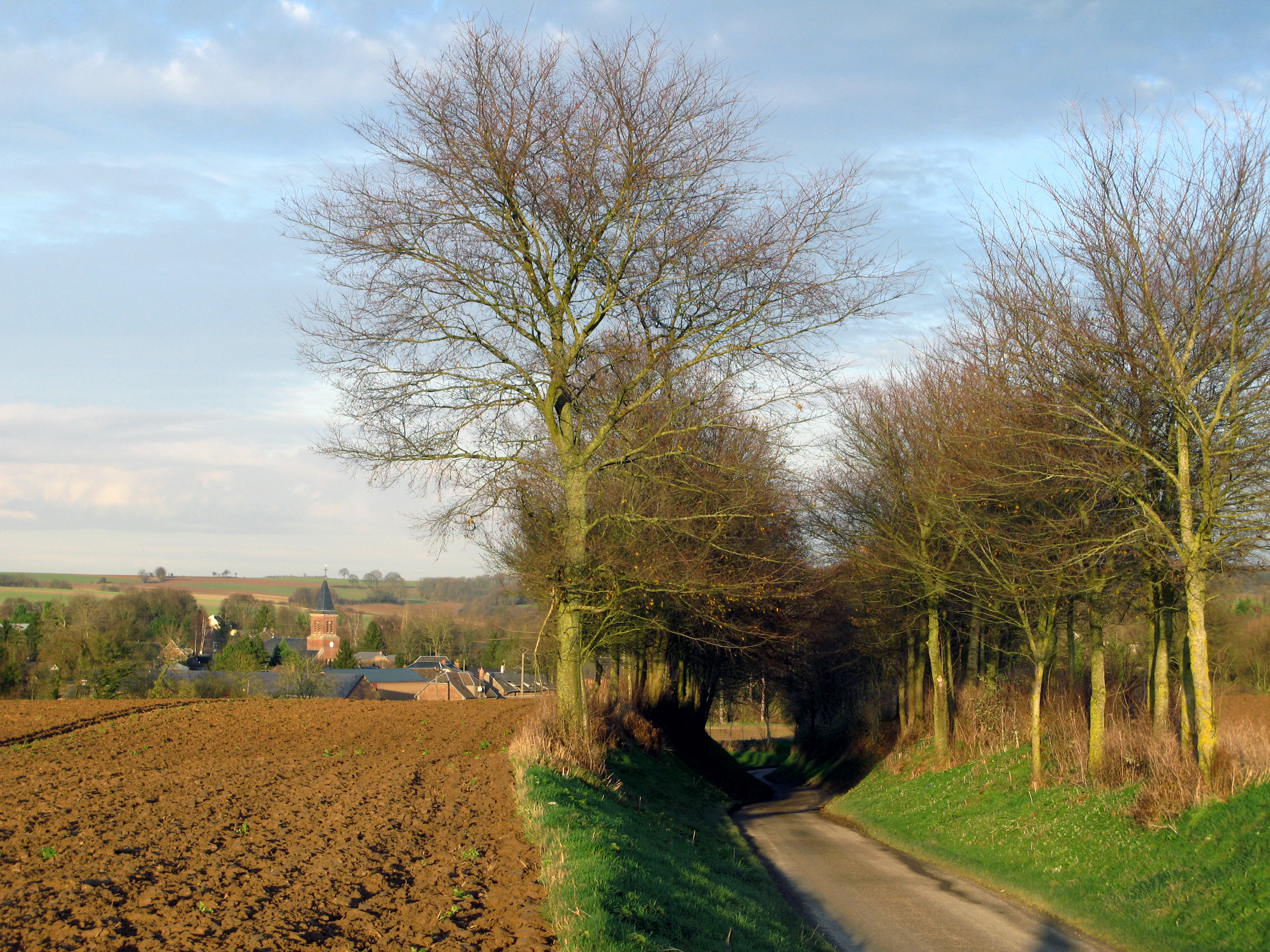
- Access to the village from Vendelles
- Location of Jeancourt
- Location within France Location within Hauts-de-France
- Coordinates: 49°55′42″N 3°08′51″E
- Country: France
- Region: Hauts-de-France
- Department: Aisne
- Arrondissement: Saint-Quentin
- Canton: Saint-Quentin-1
- Intercommunality: Pays du Vermandois

Government
  - Mayor (2026–32): Clotilde Druelle
- Area^{1}: 5.82 km^{2} (2.25 sq mi)
- Elevation: 115 m (377 ft)
- Highest elevation: 141 m (463 ft)
- Lowest elevation: 78 m (256 ft)
- Population (2023): 251
  - Density: 43.1/km^{2} (112/sq mi)
- Time zone: UTC+01:00 (CET)
  - Summer (DST): UTC+02:00 (CEST)
- INSEE/Postal code: 02390 /02490
- ^{1} French Land Register data, which excludes lakes, ponds, glaciers > 1 km^{2} (0.386 sq mi or 247 acres) and river estuaries.

Jeancourt (French pronunciation: [ʒɑ̃kuʁ]) is a commune in the Aisne department in Hauts-de-France in northern France.

== Population ==
Historical population
Year	Pop.	±% p.a.
1968	230	—
1975	232	+0.12%
1982	201	−2.03%
1990	253	+2.92%
1999	263	+0.43%
2007	236	−1.34%
2012	263	+2.19%
2017	271	+0.60%
2023	251	−1.27%
Source: INSEE

== See also ==
- Communes of the Aisne department
