= Attilly =

- Commune
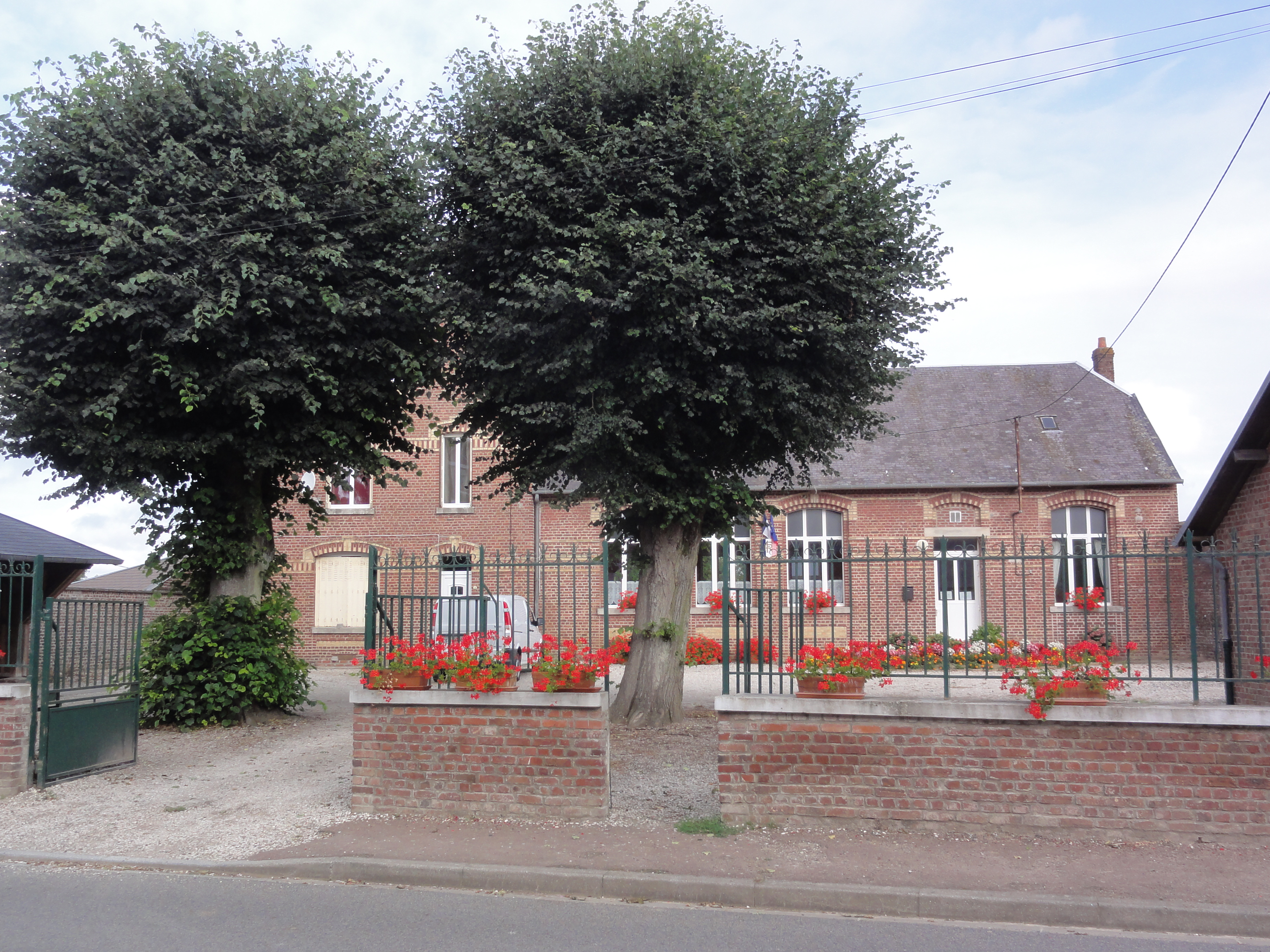
- Town hall
- Location of Attilly
- Location within France Location within Hauts-de-France
- Coordinates: 49°51′27″N 3°10′10″E
- Country: France
- Region: Hauts-de-France
- Department: Aisne
- Arrondissement: Saint-Quentin
- Canton: Saint-Quentin-1
- Intercommunality: Pays du Vermandois

Government
  - Mayor (2026–32): Patrice Miannay
- Area^{1}: 11.81 km^{2} (4.56 sq mi)
- Elevation: 150 m (490 ft)
- Highest elevation: 141 m (463 ft)
- Lowest elevation: 66 m (217 ft)
- Population (2023): 337
  - Density: 28.5/km^{2} (73.9/sq mi)
- Time zone: UTC+01:00 (CET)
  - Summer (DST): UTC+02:00 (CEST)
- INSEE/Postal code: 02029 /02490
- ^{1} French Land Register data, which excludes lakes, ponds, glaciers > 1 km^{2} (0.386 sq mi or 247 acres) and river estuaries.

Attilly (Picard: Attchy) is a commune in the department of Aisne in the Hauts-de-France region of northern France.

== Geography ==
Attilly is located 5 km west of Saint-Quentin just north of the A29 autoroute which passes through the southwestern corner of the commune. It can be accessed by several roads: the D73 from Beauvois-en-Vermandois in the southwest to Villeveque, the D733 from Etreillers in the south going northwest to Villeveque, the D33 going north from Etreillers to Attilly village and continuing north to Marteville and Vermand, the D73 from the D1029 in the north to Marteville, and the D686 from Holnon in the east to the village. There are three villages and hamlets in the commune:

- Attilly in the centre with the town hall, the school (closed), the festival hall, the church, the train station (closed), 25 cafes (all closed), and a water tower
- Marteville in the north with its cemetery, railway station (closed), castle (private) is located next to the village of Vermand
- Villeveque in the west with the villa of the Prince of Monaco, ponds for fishing, and the mill (where it is possible to learn to swim)

Much of the commune is farmland; however, it is partly surrounded by the Forests of Holnon and Attilly.

The Omignon river passes along and forms the northwestern border of the commune through Marteville and Villevèque.

== History ==
The name Attilly is derived from a word translated as "overlooking the water" and probably owes its name to its position atop a hill. The origin of the name Attilly therefore probably dates back to a Roman villa. However, the region has been inhabited for much longer.

Charles Poette wrote a history at the beginning of the 20th century. The village was destroyed during the First World War: only a single wall was still standing at the end of the conflict on the Rue du Prozet.

== Administration ==
List of Successive Mayors of Attilly

From	To	Name	Party
		François Vassant	
		Georges Lenain	
1983	2008	Pierre Vassant	
2008	2020	Jean-Paul Bruet	DVG
2020	2026	Sylvie Belmere	
2026	Present	Patrice Miannay	

== Population ==
Historical population
Year	Pop.	±% p.a.
1968	376	—
1975	376	+0.00%
1982	378	+0.08%
1990	401	+0.74%
1999	397	−0.11%
2007	398	+0.03%
2012	376	−1.13%
2017	363	−0.70%
2023	337	−1.23%
Source: INSEE

== Sites and Monuments ==
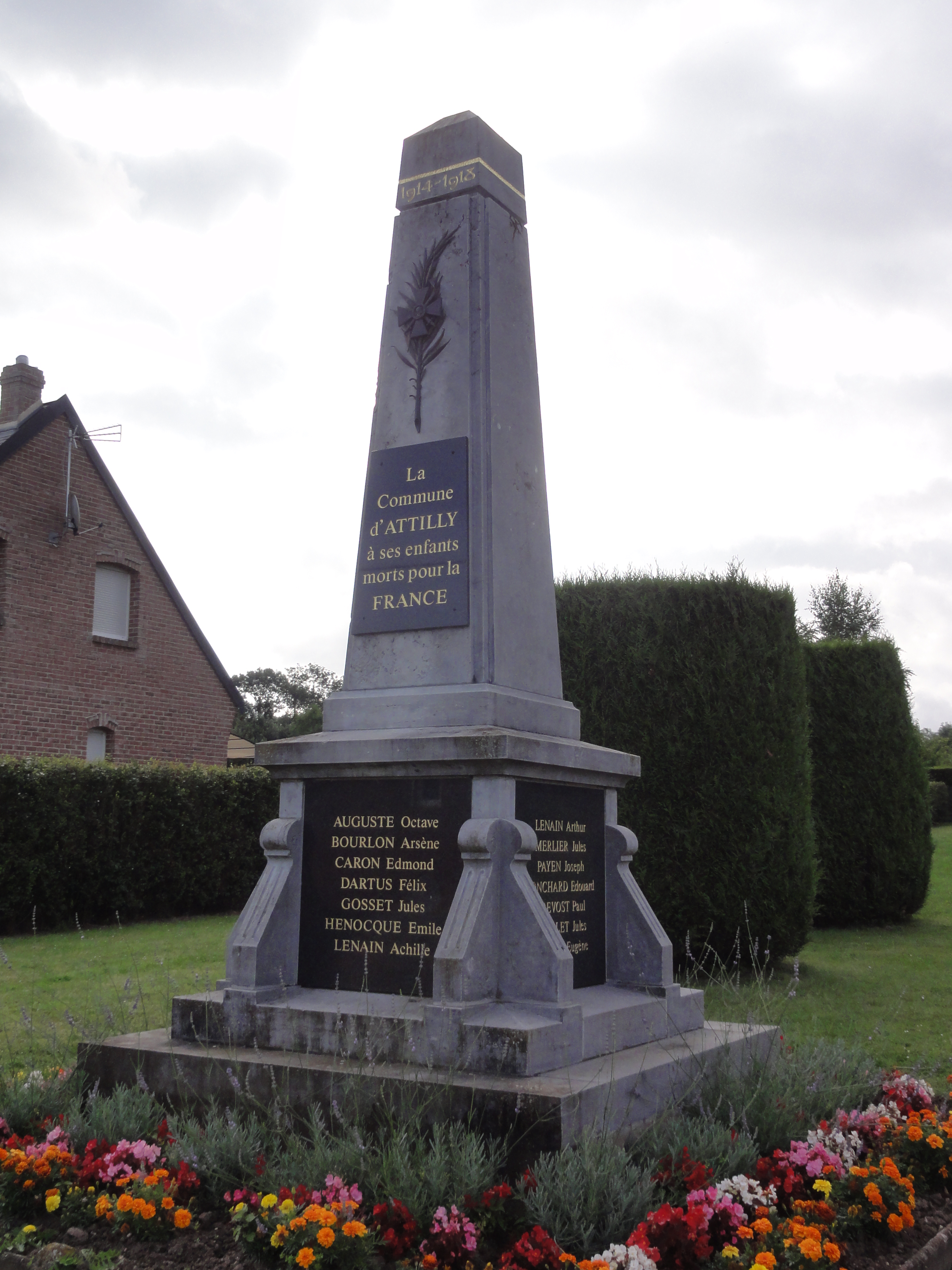
The War memorial

- The Church of Saint Martin
- The War memorial commemorating the First World War.
- Marteville Communal Cemetery, a British military cemetery managed by the Commonwealth War Graves Commission.
- A Calvary on the road between Attilly and Marteville (Vermand), another between Attilly and Holnon, and another on the road to Etreillers. There is also one at the entrance to the village from the Attilly forest which is located facing the road to Vermand not far from the church
- A Calvary or Wayside Cross on the dirt road towards Etreillers after the water tower at the top of the village.
- A Tomb on the road to Etreillers
- The Place Verte (Green Square) located on the old Roman road between Holnon and Vermand
- The ruins of a Chapel in the middle of Attilly forest where there was an old village abandoned after the First World War
- The Place du Sar (Royal Square) where 14 July is celebrated and where the hall is built
- A Dovecote next to the Rue de l'Eglise.

== Picture Gallery ==
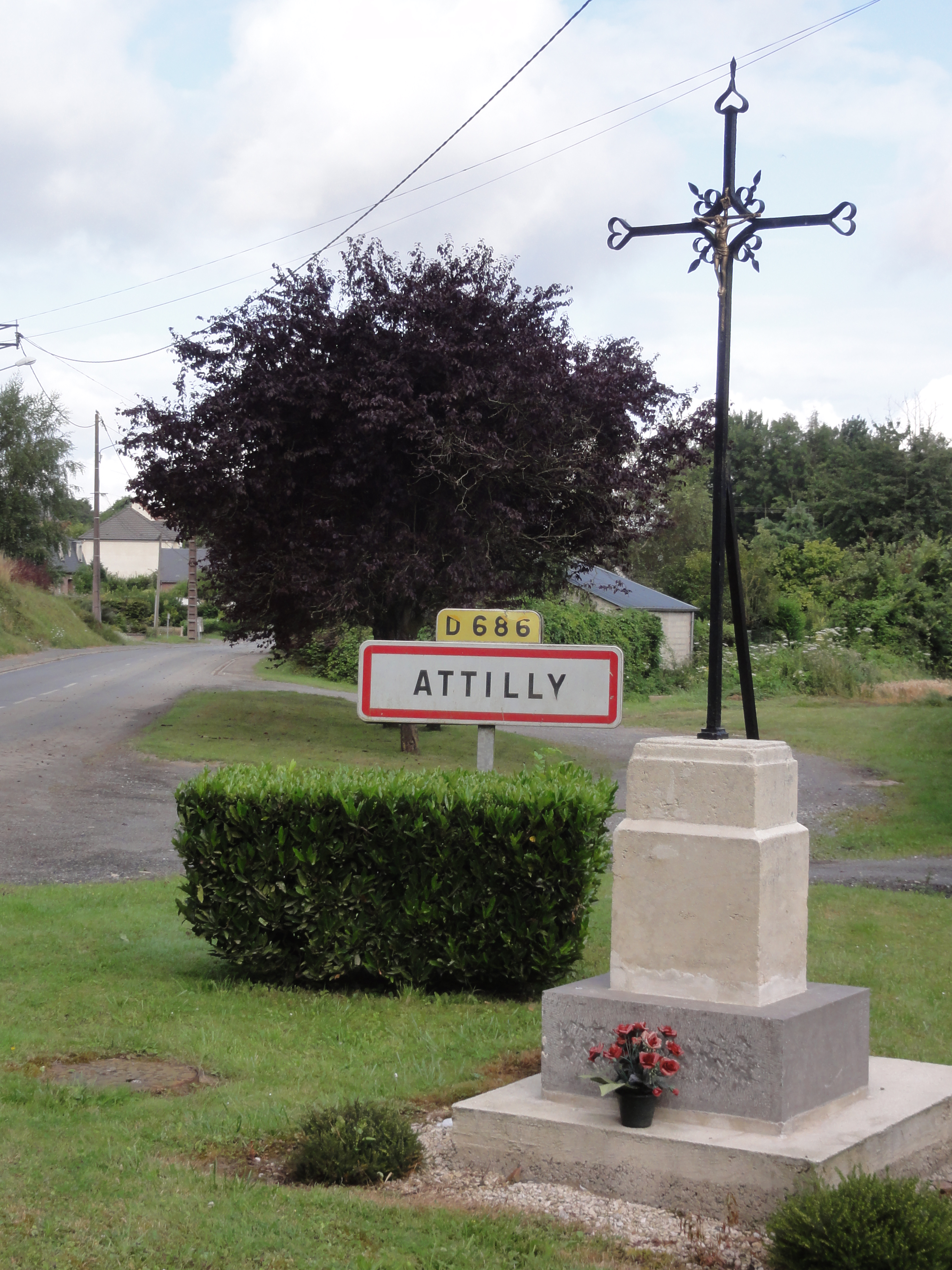
Entrance to the town and a Wayside Cross

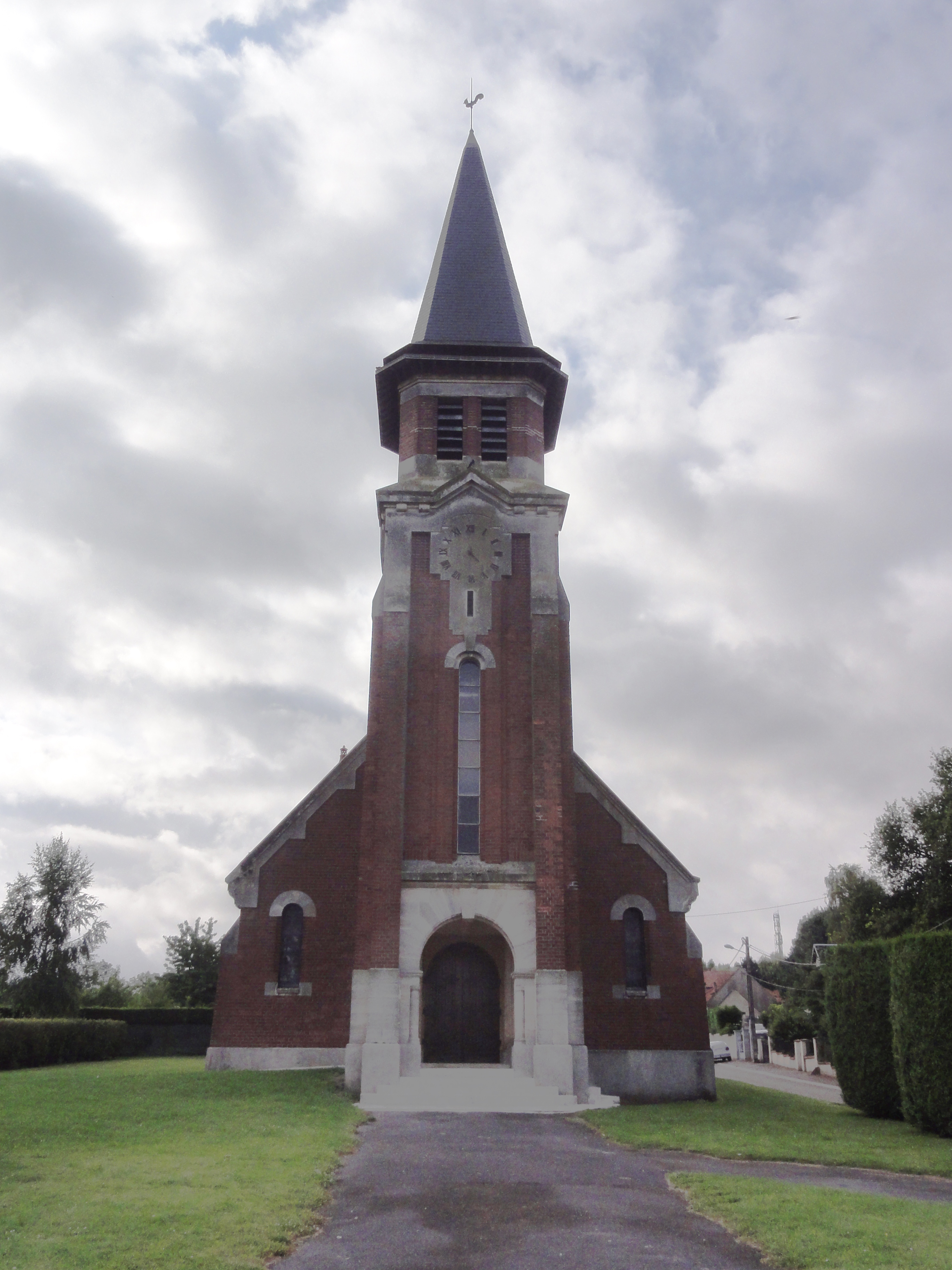
The Church of Saint Martin

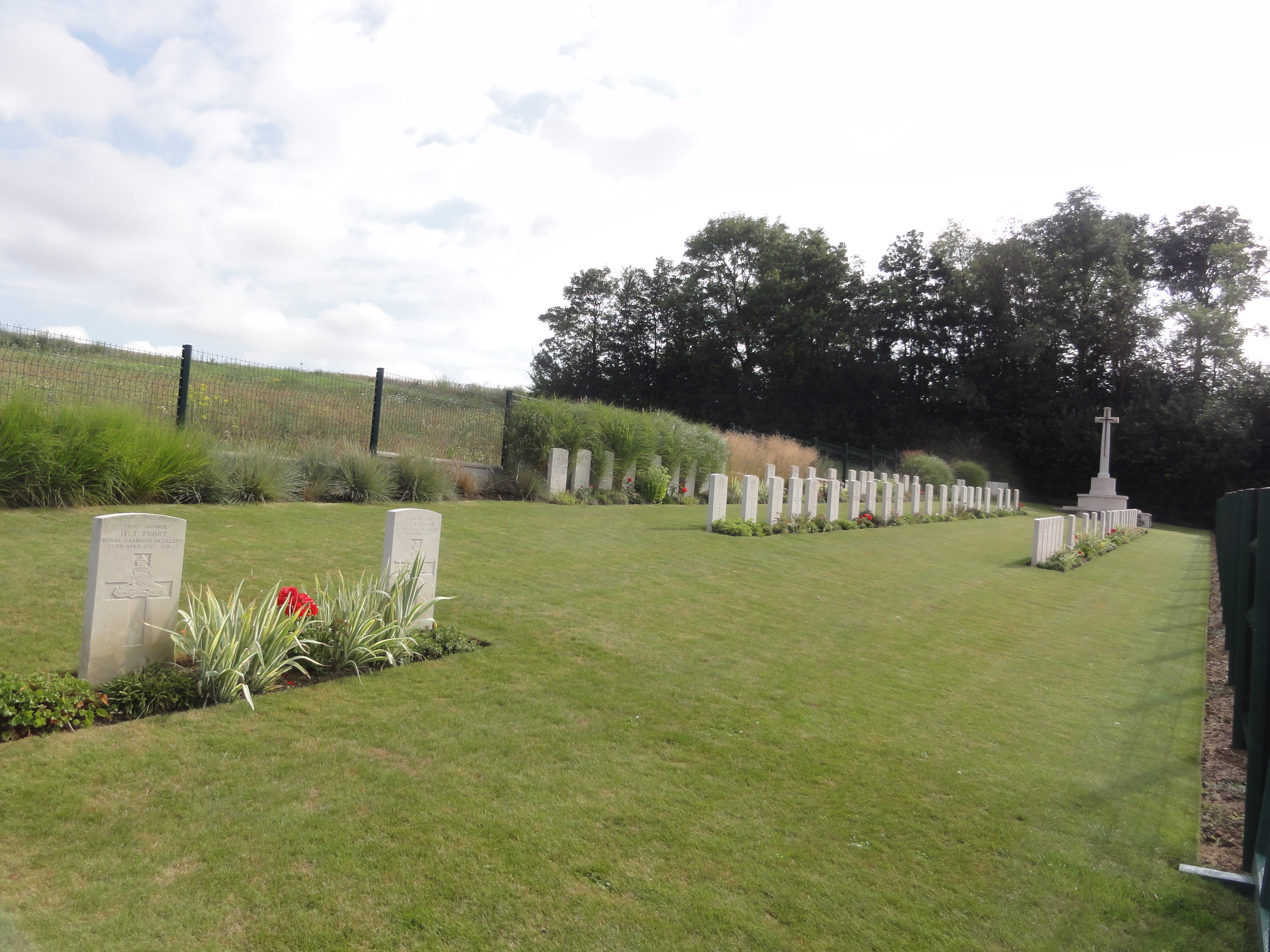
The Marteville Communal Cemetery

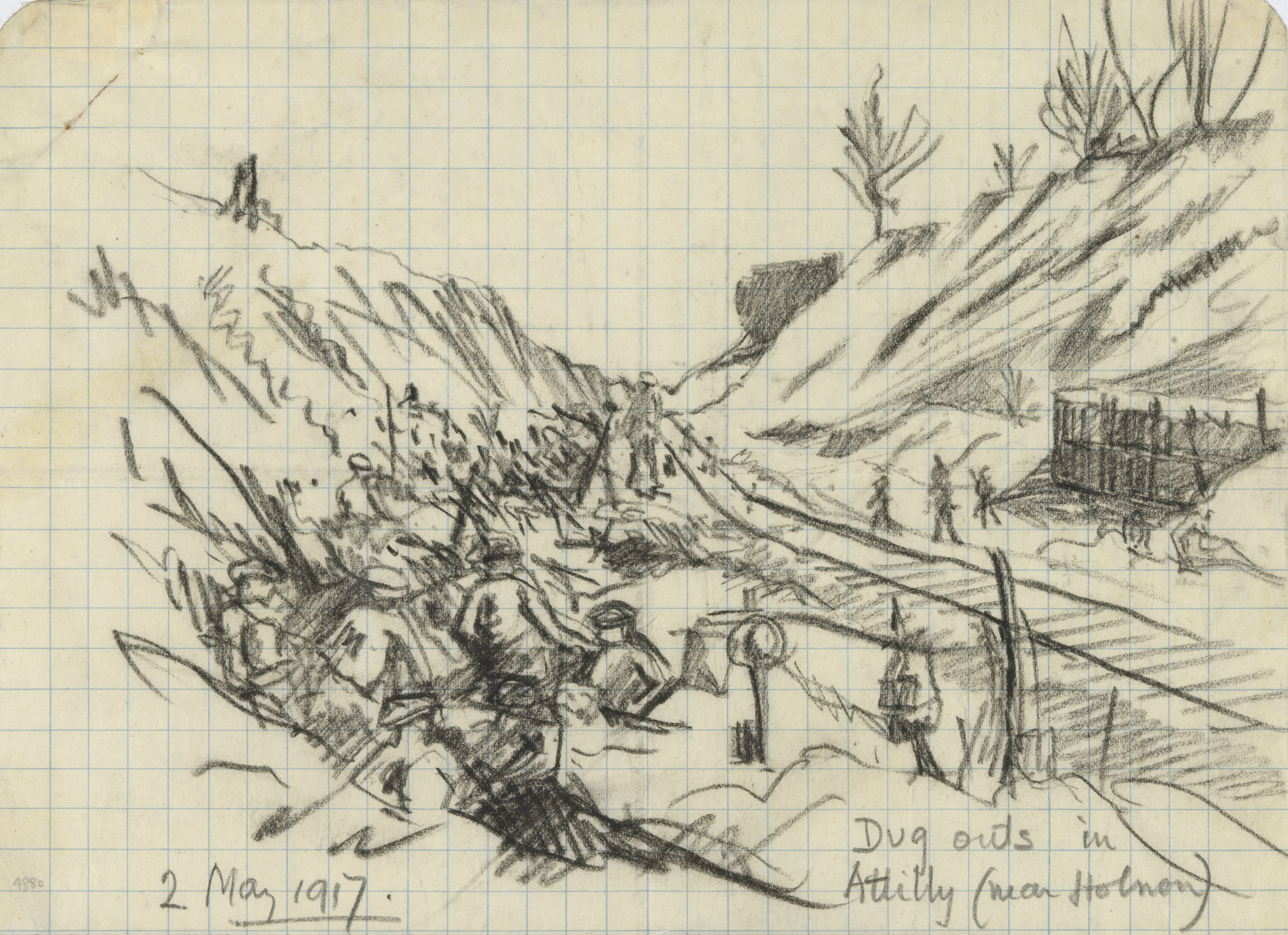
Dugouts in Attilly 2 May 1917

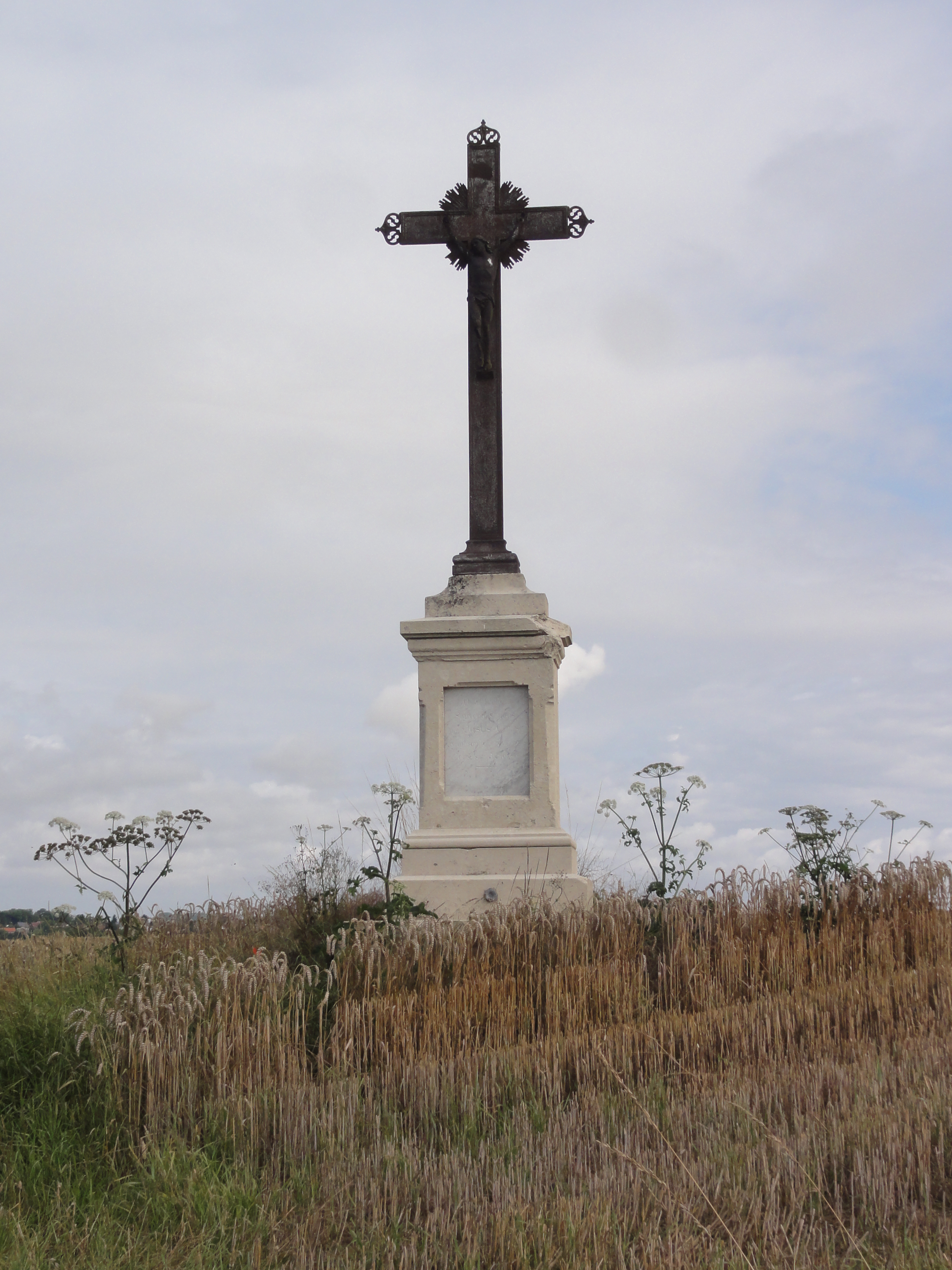
A Wayside Cross

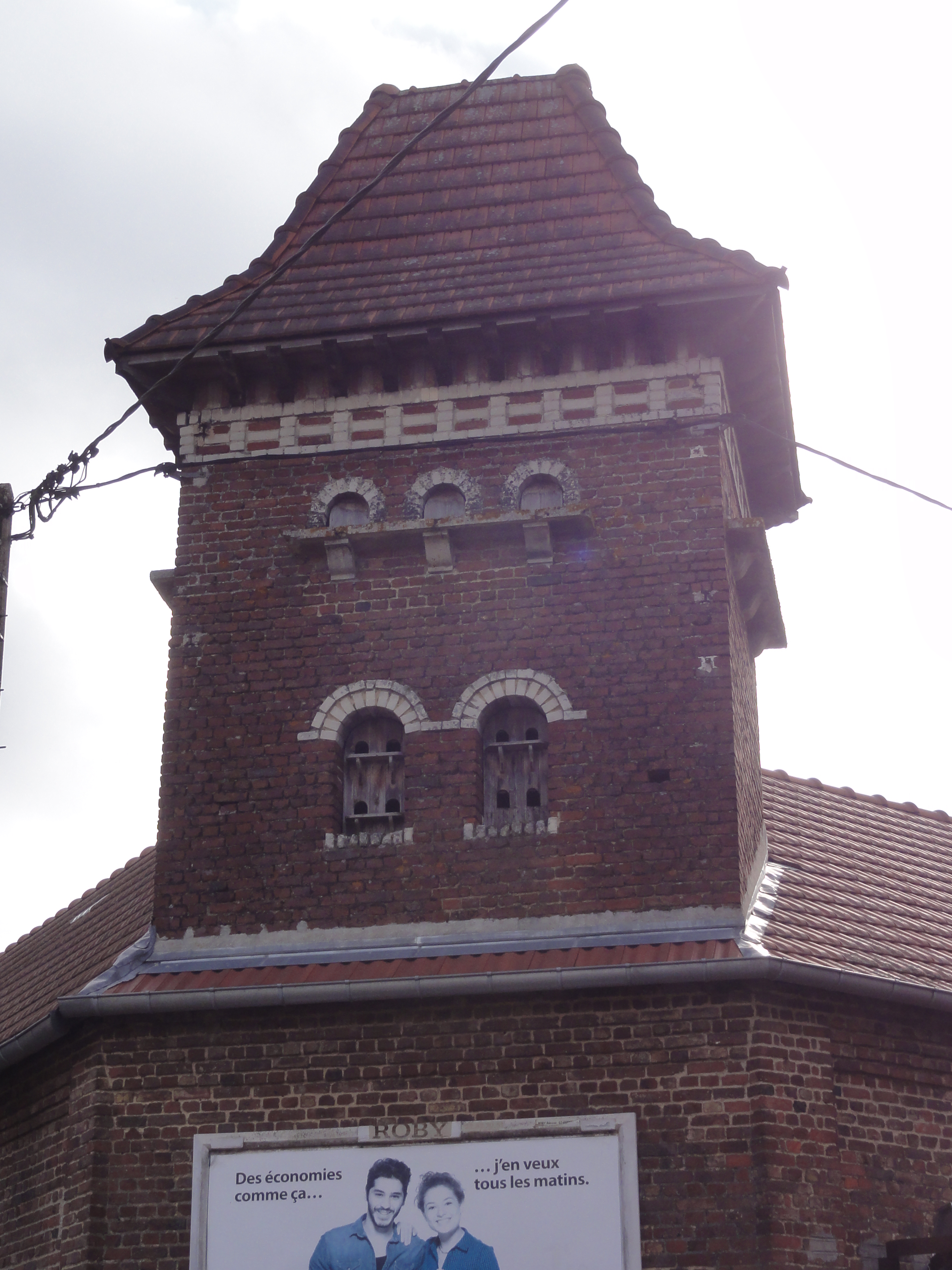
The Dovecote

== Culture ==
The language spoken in Attilly is still a Picard dialect.

== See also ==
- Communes of the Aisne department
