= Francilly-Selency =

- Commune
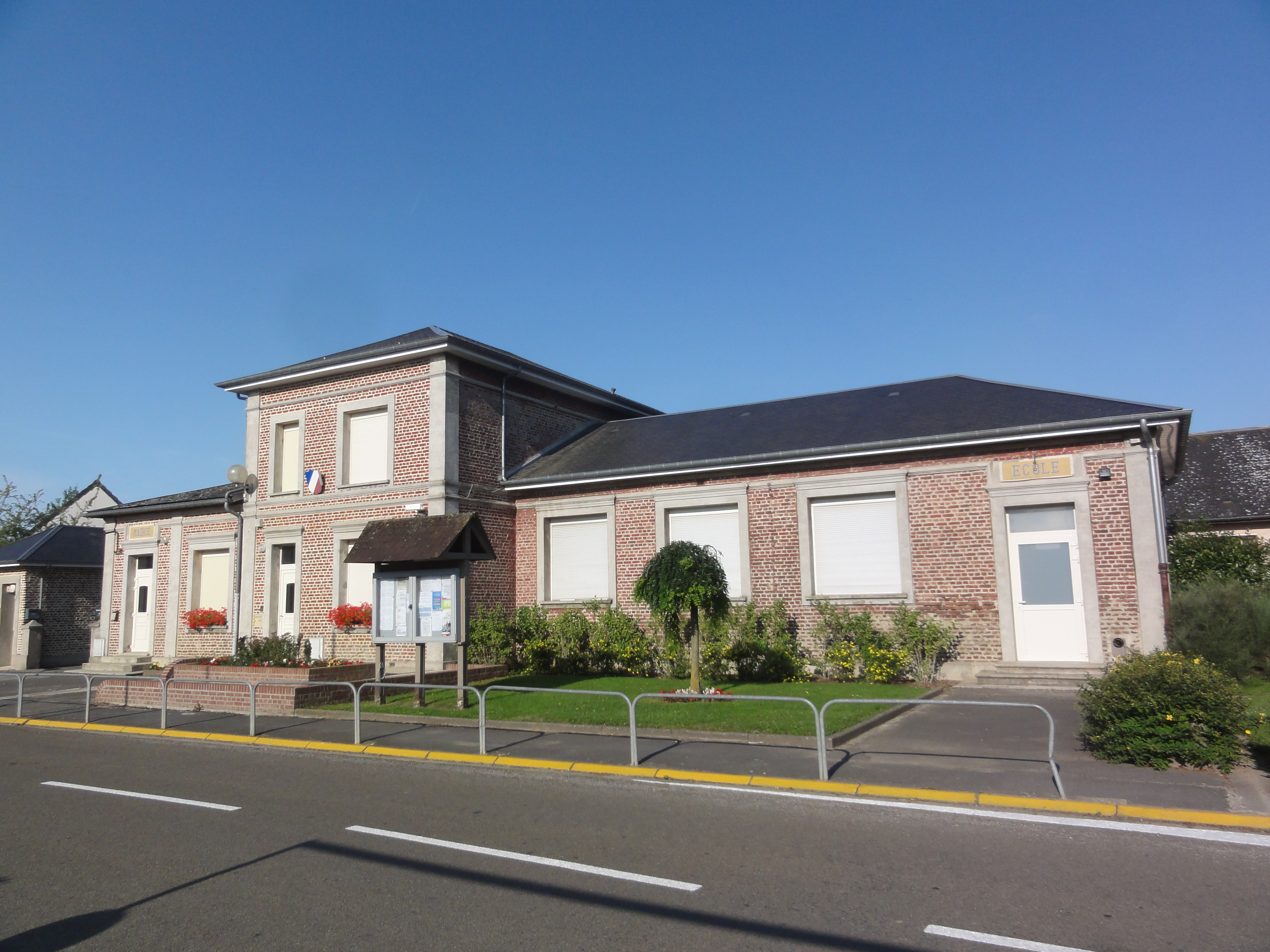
- The town hall and school of Francilly-Selency
- Location of Francilly-Selency
- Location within France Location within Hauts-de-France
- Coordinates: 49°51′12″N 3°13′28″E
- Country: France
- Region: Hauts-de-France
- Department: Aisne
- Arrondissement: Saint-Quentin
- Canton: Saint-Quentin-1
- Intercommunality: Pays du Vermandois

Government
  - Mayor (2026–32): Daniel Denivet
- Area^{1}: 5.43 km^{2} (2.10 sq mi)
- Elevation: 117 m (384 ft)
- Highest elevation: 128 m (420 ft)
- Lowest elevation: 86 m (282 ft)
- Population (2023): 463
  - Density: 85.3/km^{2} (221/sq mi)
- Time zone: UTC+01:00 (CET)
  - Summer (DST): UTC+02:00 (CEST)
- INSEE/Postal code: 02330 /02760
- ^{1} French Land Register data, which excludes lakes, ponds, glaciers > 1 km^{2} (0.386 sq mi or 247 acres) and river estuaries.

Francilly-Selency is a commune in the Aisne department in Hauts-de-France in northern France.

== Population ==
Historical population
Year	Pop.	±% p.a.
1968	229	—
1975	343	+5.94%
1982	426	+3.14%
1990	419	−0.21%
1999	435	+0.42%
2007	458	+0.65%
2012	443	−0.66%
2017	474	+1.36%
2023	463	−0.39%
Source: INSEE

== See also ==
- Communes of the Aisne department
