= Canton of Saint-Quentin-1 =

Coordinates: 49.86°N 3.23°E

- Canton
- Situation of the canton of Saint-Quentin-1 in the department of Aisne
- Country: France
- Region: Hauts-de-France
- Department: Aisne
- No. of communes: {{{nbcomm}}}
- Population (2023): 28,033
- INSEE code: 0213

The canton of Saint-Quentin-1 is an administrative division of the Aisne department, northern France. It was created at the French canton reorganisation which came into effect in March 2015. Its seat is in Saint-Quentin.

It consists of the following communes:

1. Attilly
2. Beauvois-en-Vermandois
3. Caulaincourt
4. Douchy
5. Étreillers
6. Fayet
7. Fluquières
8. Foreste
9. Francilly-Selency
10. Germaine
11. Gricourt
12. Holnon
13. Jeancourt
14. Lanchy
15. Maissemy
16. Pontru
17. Pontruet
18. Roupy
19. Saint-Quentin (partly)
20. Savy
21. Trefcon
22. Vaux-en-Vermandois
23. Vendelles
24. Le Verguier
25. Vermand
