= Savy, Aisne =

Savy
- Commune
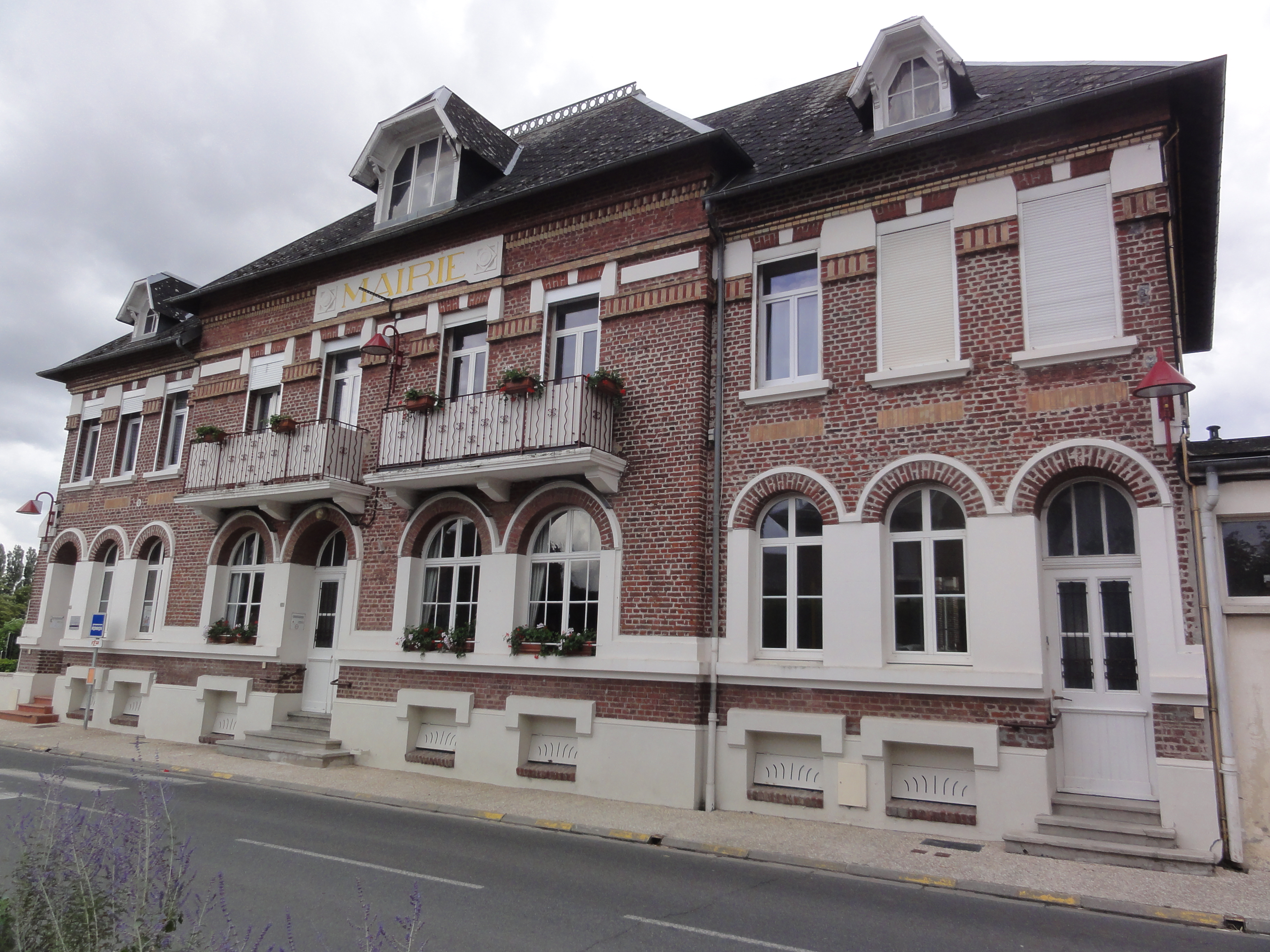
- The town hall of Savy
- Location of Savy
- Location within France Location within Hauts-de-France
- Coordinates: 49°49′51″N 3°11′37″E
- Country: France
- Region: Hauts-de-France
- Department: Aisne
- Arrondissement: Saint-Quentin
- Canton: Saint-Quentin-1
- Intercommunality: Pays du Vermandois

Government
  - Mayor (2026–32): Yannick Humain
- Area^{1}: 7.49 km^{2} (2.89 sq mi)
- Elevation: 101 m (331 ft)
- Highest elevation: 121 m (397 ft)
- Lowest elevation: 84 m (276 ft)
- Population (2023): 618
  - Density: 82.5/km^{2} (214/sq mi)
- Time zone: UTC+01:00 (CET)
  - Summer (DST): UTC+02:00 (CEST)
- INSEE/Postal code: 02702 /02590
- ^{1} French Land Register data, which excludes lakes, ponds, glaciers > 1 km^{2} (0.386 sq mi or 247 acres) and river estuaries.

Savy (French pronunciation: [savi]) is a commune in the Aisne department in Hauts-de-France, located in northern France.

== Population ==
Historical population
Year	Pop.	±% p.a.
1968	484	—
1975	560	+2.11%
1982	723	+3.72%
1990	702	−0.37%
1999	704	+0.03%
2007	642	−1.15%
2012	598	−1.41%
2017	609	+0.37%
2023	618	+0.24%
Source: INSEE

== See also ==
- Communes of the Aisne department
