= Fayet, Aisne =

Fayet
- Commune
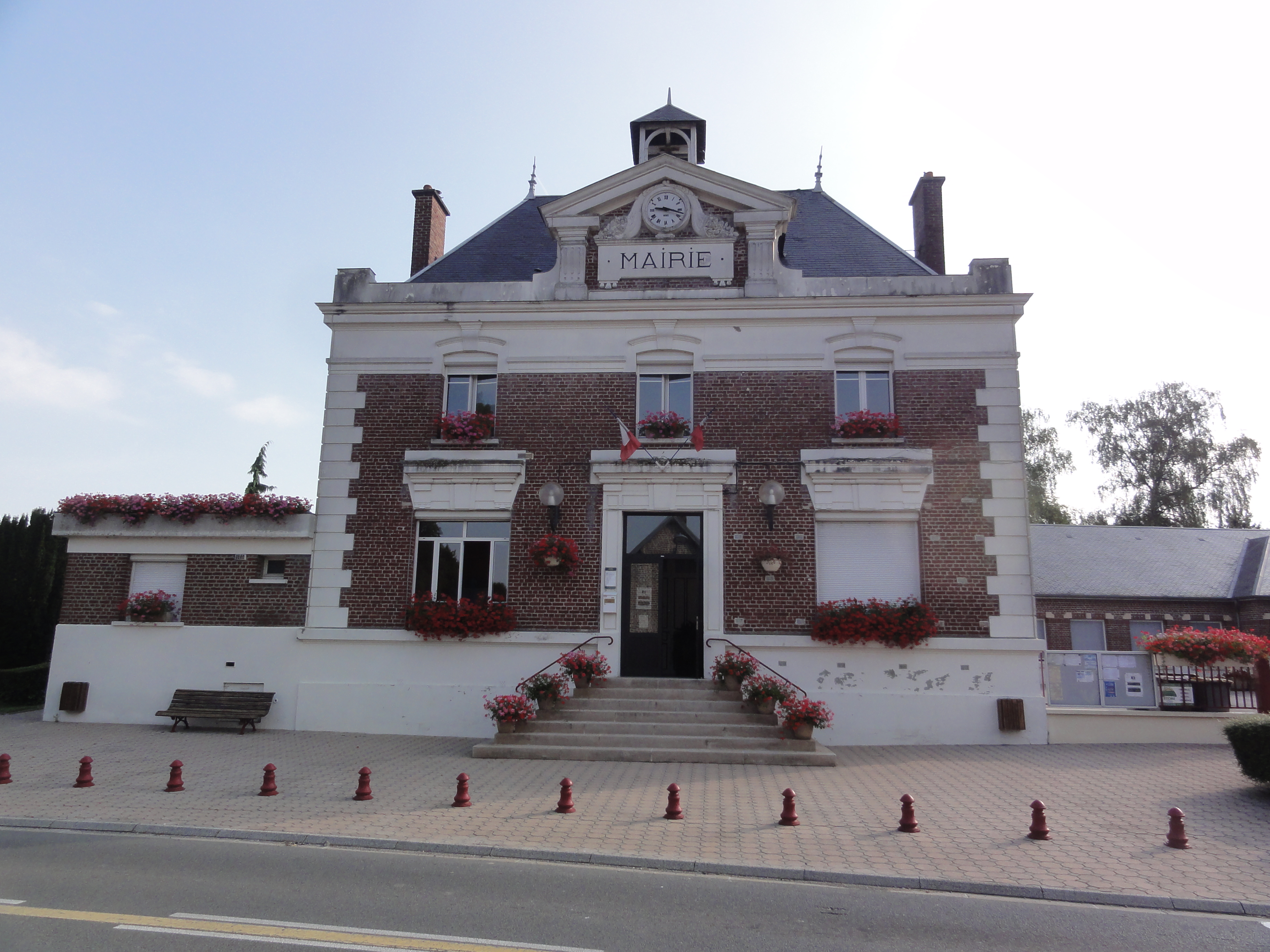
- The town hall of Fayet

- Coat of arms
- Location of Fayet
- Location within France Location within Hauts-de-France
- Coordinates: 49°52′12″N 3°15′08″E
- Country: France
- Region: Hauts-de-France
- Department: Aisne
- Arrondissement: Saint-Quentin
- Canton: Saint-Quentin-1
- Intercommunality: CA Saint-Quentinois

Government
  - Mayor (2026–32): Virginie Ardaens
- Area^{1}: 5.86 km^{2} (2.26 sq mi)
- Elevation: 124 m (407 ft)
- Highest elevation: 131 m (430 ft)
- Lowest elevation: 82 m (269 ft)
- Population (2023): 724
  - Density: 124/km^{2} (320/sq mi)
- Time zone: UTC+01:00 (CET)
  - Summer (DST): UTC+02:00 (CEST)
- INSEE/Postal code: 02303 /02100
- ^{1} French Land Register data, which excludes lakes, ponds, glaciers > 1 km^{2} (0.386 sq mi or 247 acres) and river estuaries.

Fayet (French pronunciation: [fajɛ]) is a commune in the Aisne department in Hauts-de-France northern France.

== Population ==
Historical population
| Year | Pop. | ±% p.a. |
|---|---|---|
| 1968 | 361 | — |
| 1975 | 542 | +5.98% |
| 1982 | 586 | +1.12% |
| 1990 | 582 | −0.09% |
| 1999 | 580 | −0.04% |
| 2007 | 532 | −1.07% |
| 2012 | 671 | +4.75% |
| 2017 | 654 | −0.51% |
| 2023 | 724 | +1.71% |
Source: INSEE

== See also ==
- Communes of the Aisne department
