= Maissemy =

- Commune
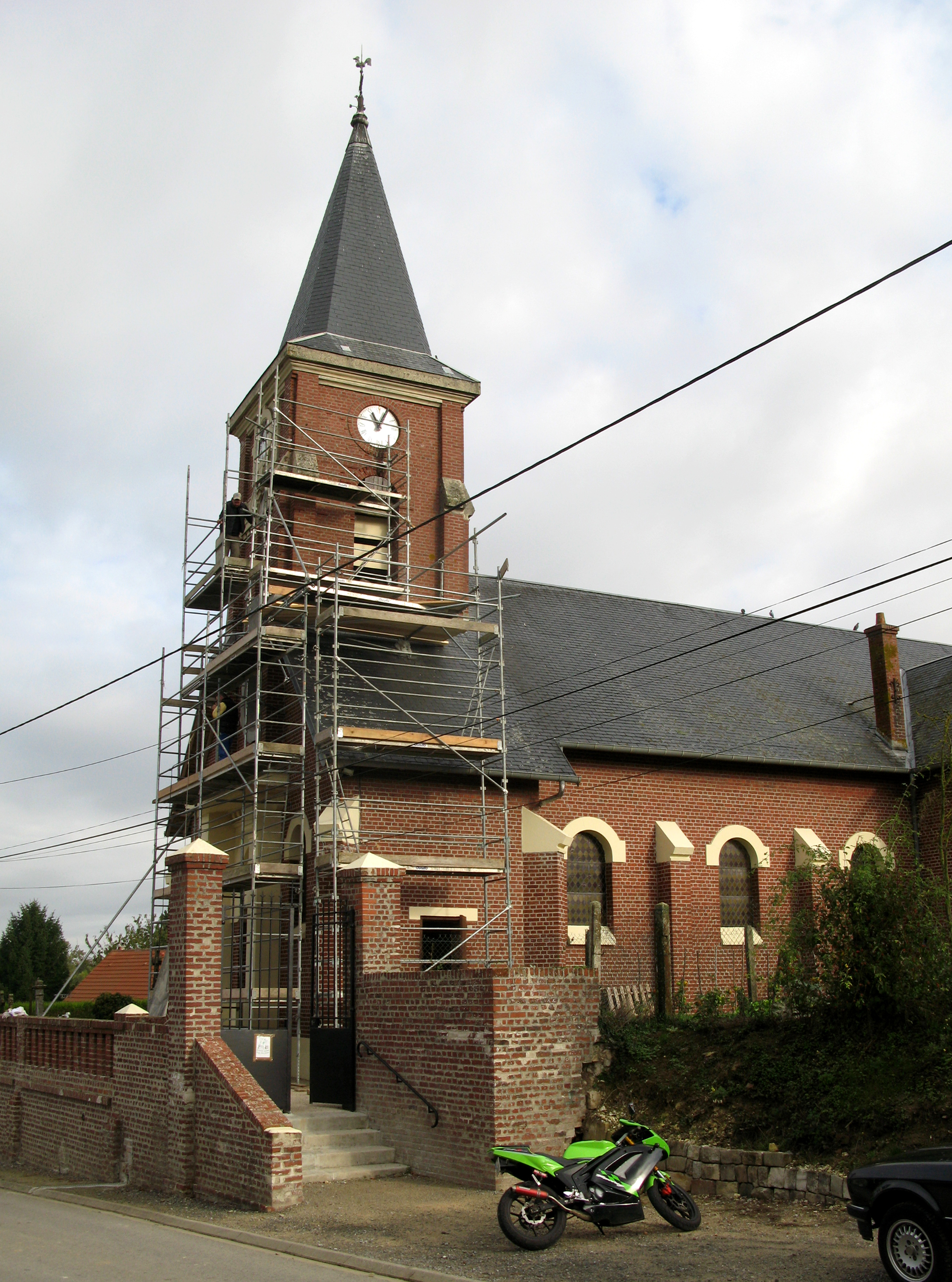
- The church of Maissemy
- Location of Maissemy
- Location within France Location within Hauts-de-France
- Coordinates: 49°53′39″N 3°11′18″E
- Country: France
- Region: Hauts-de-France
- Department: Aisne
- Arrondissement: Saint-Quentin
- Canton: Saint-Quentin-1
- Intercommunality: Pays du Vermandois

Government
  - Mayor (2026–32): Hubert Delalieu
- Area^{1}: 8.17 km^{2} (3.15 sq mi)
- Elevation: 98 m (322 ft)
- Highest elevation: 123 m (404 ft)
- Lowest elevation: 71 m (233 ft)
- Population (2023): 232
  - Density: 28.4/km^{2} (73.5/sq mi)
- Time zone: UTC+01:00 (CET)
  - Summer (DST): UTC+02:00 (CEST)
- INSEE/Postal code: 02452 /02490
- ^{1} French Land Register data, which excludes lakes, ponds, glaciers > 1 km^{2} (0.386 sq mi or 247 acres) and river estuaries.

Maissemy is a commune in the Aisne department in Hauts-de-France in northern France.

== Population ==
Historical population
Year	Pop.	±% p.a.
1968	213	—
1975	203	−0.68%
1982	174	−2.18%
1990	157	−1.28%
1999	194	+2.38%
2007	236	+2.48%
2012	245	+0.75%
2017	239	−0.49%
2023	232	−0.49%
Source: INSEE

== See also ==
- Communes of the Aisne department
