= Gricourt =

- Commune
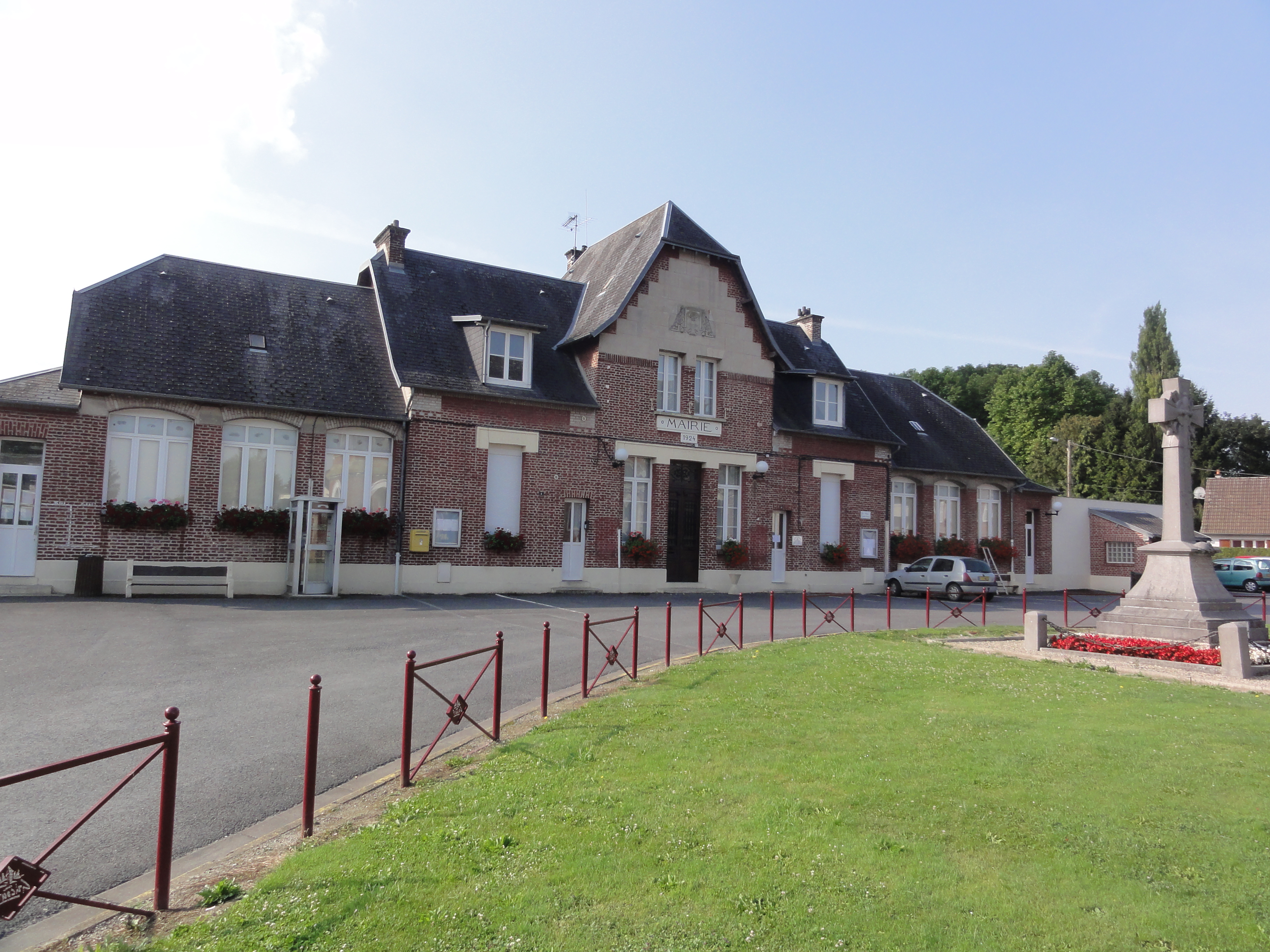
- The town hall of Gricourt
- Location of Gricourt
- Location within France Location within Hauts-de-France
- Coordinates: 49°53′22″N 3°14′43″E
- Country: France
- Region: Hauts-de-France
- Department: Aisne
- Arrondissement: Saint-Quentin
- Canton: Saint-Quentin-1
- Intercommunality: Pays du Vermandois

Government
  - Mayor (2026–32): Roland Varlet
- Area^{1}: 9.92 km^{2} (3.83 sq mi)
- Elevation: 45 m (148 ft)
- Highest elevation: 131 m (430 ft)
- Lowest elevation: 78 m (256 ft)
- Population (2023): 1,011
  - Density: 102/km^{2} (264/sq mi)
- Time zone: UTC+01:00 (CET)
  - Summer (DST): UTC+02:00 (CEST)
- INSEE/Postal code: 02355 /02100
- ^{1} French Land Register data, which excludes lakes, ponds, glaciers > 1 km^{2} (0.386 sq mi or 247 acres) and river estuaries.

Gricourt (French pronunciation: [ɡʁikuʁ]) is a commune in the Aisne department and Hauts-de-France region, northern France.

== Population ==
Historical population
Year	Pop.	±% p.a.
1968	397	—
1975	669	+7.74%
1982	651	−0.39%
1990	761	+1.97%
1999	739	−0.33%
2007	850	+1.76%
2012	929	+1.79%
2017	980	+1.07%
2023	1,011	+0.52%
Source: INSEE

== See also ==
- Communes of the Aisne department
