= Lanchy =

- Commune
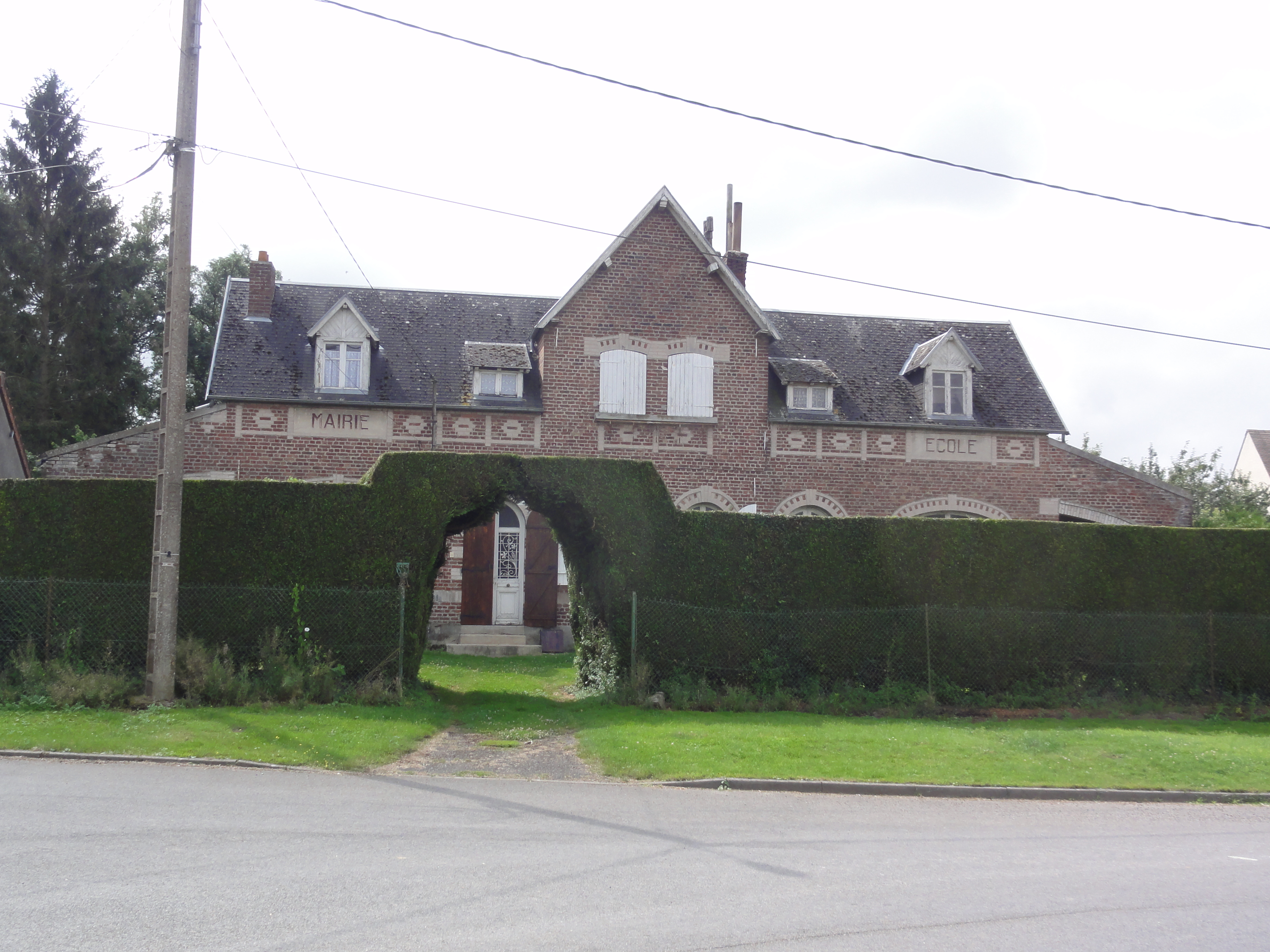
- The town hall and school of Lanchy
- Location of Lanchy
- Location within France Location within Hauts-de-France
- Coordinates: 49°49′38″N 3°04′35″E
- Country: France
- Region: Hauts-de-France
- Department: Aisne
- Arrondissement: Saint-Quentin
- Canton: Saint-Quentin-1
- Intercommunality: Pays du Vermandois

Government
  - Mayor (2026–32): Xavier de Romance
- Area^{1}: 3.69 km^{2} (1.42 sq mi)
- Elevation: 98 m (322 ft)
- Highest elevation: 94 m (308 ft)
- Lowest elevation: 84 m (276 ft)
- Population (2023): 38
  - Density: 10/km^{2} (27/sq mi)
- Time zone: UTC+01:00 (CET)
  - Summer (DST): UTC+02:00 (CEST)
- INSEE/Postal code: 02402 /02590
- ^{1} French Land Register data, which excludes lakes, ponds, glaciers > 1 km^{2} (0.386 sq mi or 247 acres) and river estuaries.

Lanchy (French pronunciation: [lɑ̃ʃi]) is a commune in the Aisne department in Hauts-de-France in northern France.

== Population ==
Historical population
| Year | Pop. | ±% p.a. |
|---|---|---|
| 1968 | 68 | — |
| 1975 | 60 | −1.77% |
| 1982 | 53 | −1.76% |
| 1990 | 54 | +0.23% |
| 1999 | 63 | +1.73% |
| 2007 | 55 | −1.68% |
| 2012 | 50 | −1.89% |
| 2017 | 37 | −5.84% |
| 2023 | 38 | +0.45% |
Source: INSEE

== See also ==
- Communes of the Aisne department
