= Germaine, Aisne =

Germaine
- Commune
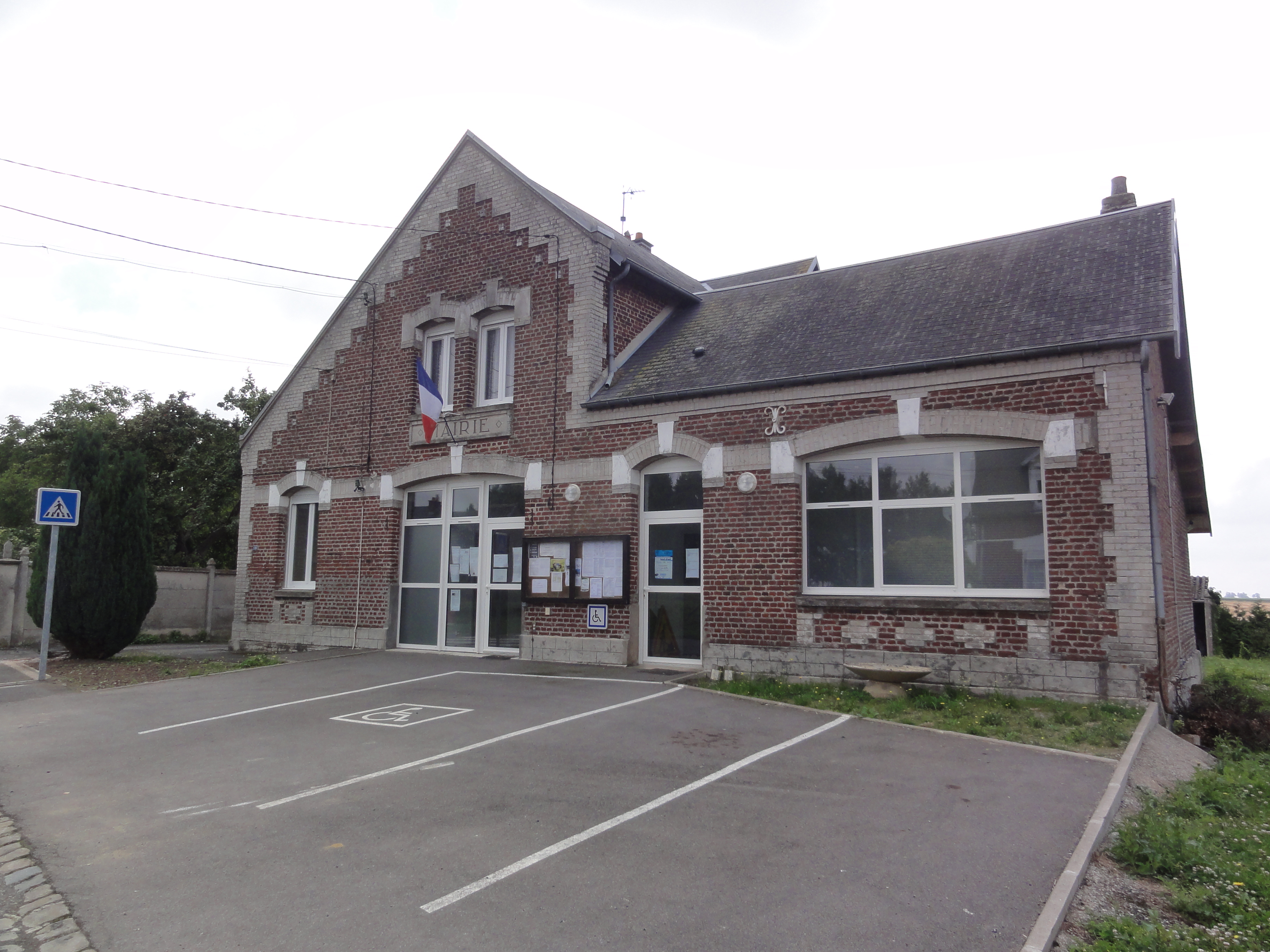
- The town hall of Germaine
- Location of Germaine
- Location within France Location within Hauts-de-France
- Coordinates: 49°48′43″N 3°06′57″E
- Country: France
- Region: Hauts-de-France
- Department: Aisne
- Arrondissement: Saint-Quentin
- Canton: Saint-Quentin-1
- Intercommunality: Pays du Vermandois

Government
  - Mayor (2026–32): Charlotte Brayer
- Area^{1}: 4.54 km^{2} (1.75 sq mi)
- Elevation: 91 m (299 ft)
- Highest elevation: 94 m (308 ft)
- Lowest elevation: 68 m (223 ft)
- Population (2023): 84
  - Density: 19/km^{2} (48/sq mi)
- Time zone: UTC+01:00 (CET)
  - Summer (DST): UTC+02:00 (CEST)
- INSEE/Postal code: 02343 /02590
- ^{1} French Land Register data, which excludes lakes, ponds, glaciers > 1 km^{2} (0.386 sq mi or 247 acres) and river estuaries.

Germaine (French pronunciation: [ʒɛʁmɛn]) is a commune in the Aisne department in Hauts-de-France in northern France.

== Population ==
Historical population
Year	Pop.	±% p.a.
1968	105	—
1975	106	+0.14%
1982	103	−0.41%
1990	75	−3.89%
1999	67	−1.25%
2007	66	−0.19%
2012	69	+0.89%
2017	81	+3.26%
2023	84	+0.61%
Source: INSEE

== See also ==
- Communes of the Aisne department
