= Trefcon =

- Commune
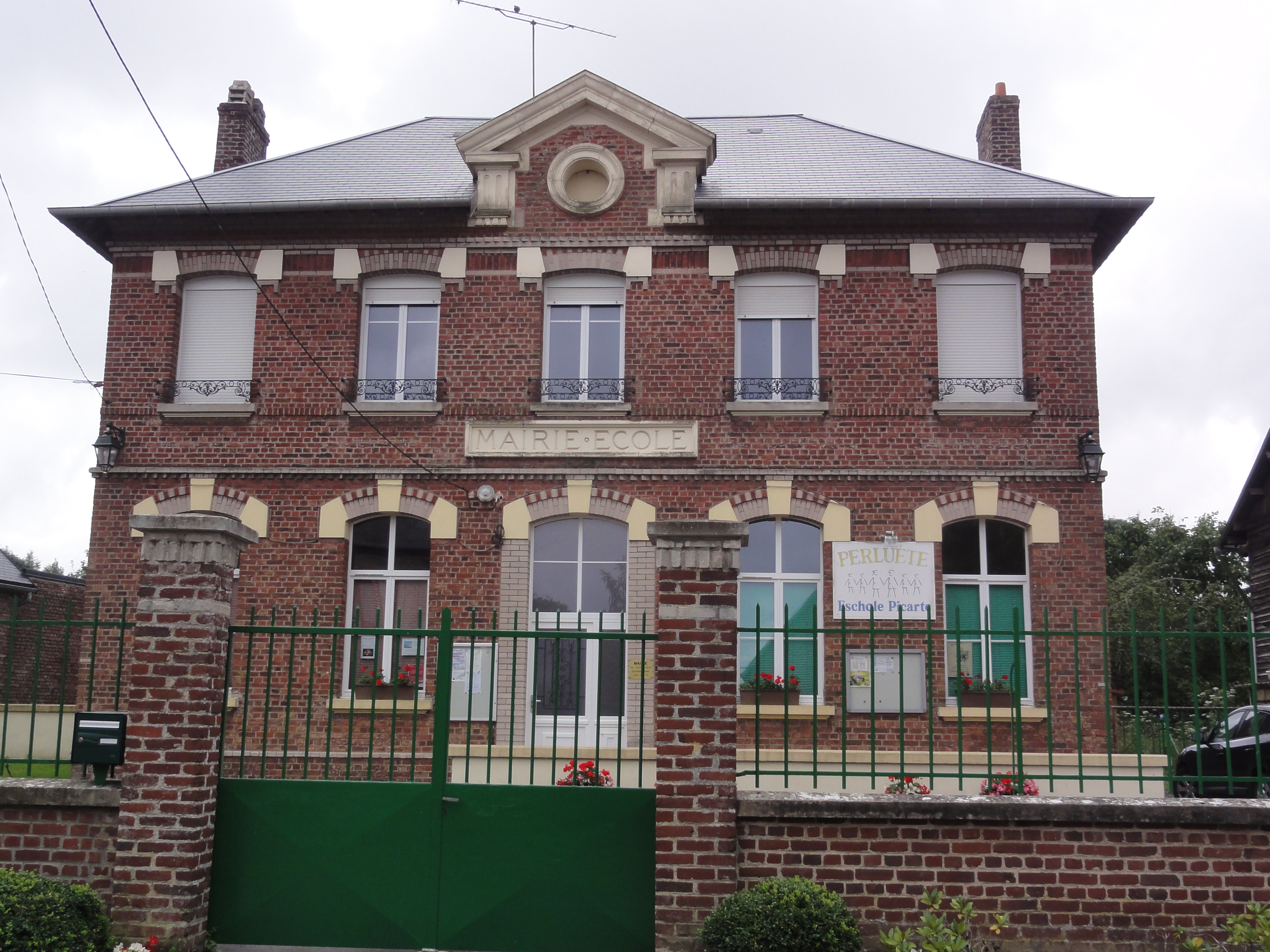
- The town hall and school of Trefcon
- Location of Trefcon
- Location within France Location within Hauts-de-France
- Coordinates: 49°51′31″N 3°05′46″E
- Country: France
- Region: Hauts-de-France
- Department: Aisne
- Arrondissement: Saint-Quentin
- Canton: Saint-Quentin-1
- Intercommunality: Pays du Vermandois

Government
  - Mayor (2026–32): Véronique Rozier
- Area^{1}: 4.02 km^{2} (1.55 sq mi)
- Elevation: 100 m (330 ft)
- Highest elevation: 98 m (322 ft)
- Lowest elevation: 61 m (200 ft)
- Population (2023): 80
  - Density: 20/km^{2} (52/sq mi)
- Time zone: UTC+01:00 (CET)
  - Summer (DST): UTC+02:00 (CEST)
- INSEE/Postal code: 02747 /02490
- ^{1} French Land Register data, which excludes lakes, ponds, glaciers > 1 km^{2} (0.386 sq mi or 247 acres) and river estuaries.

Trefcon (French pronunciation: [tʁɛfkɔ̃]) is a commune in the Aisne department in Hauts-de-France in northern France.

An old alternative name was Saint-Martin-des-Prés. Named after the old ruined church of the same name.

== Population ==
Historical population
| Year | Pop. | ±% p.a. |
|---|---|---|
| 1962 | 99 | — |
| 1968 | 94 | −0.86% |
| 1975 | 86 | −1.26% |
| 1982 | 87 | +0.17% |
| 1990 | 83 | −0.59% |
| 1999 | 95 | +1.51% |
| 2007 | 82 | −1.82% |
| 2012 | 89 | +1.65% |
| 2017 | 85 | −0.92% |
| 2023 | 80 | −1.01% |
Source: EHESS (1962) and INSEE (1968–2023)

== See also ==
- Communes of the Aisne department
