= Fluquières =

- Commune
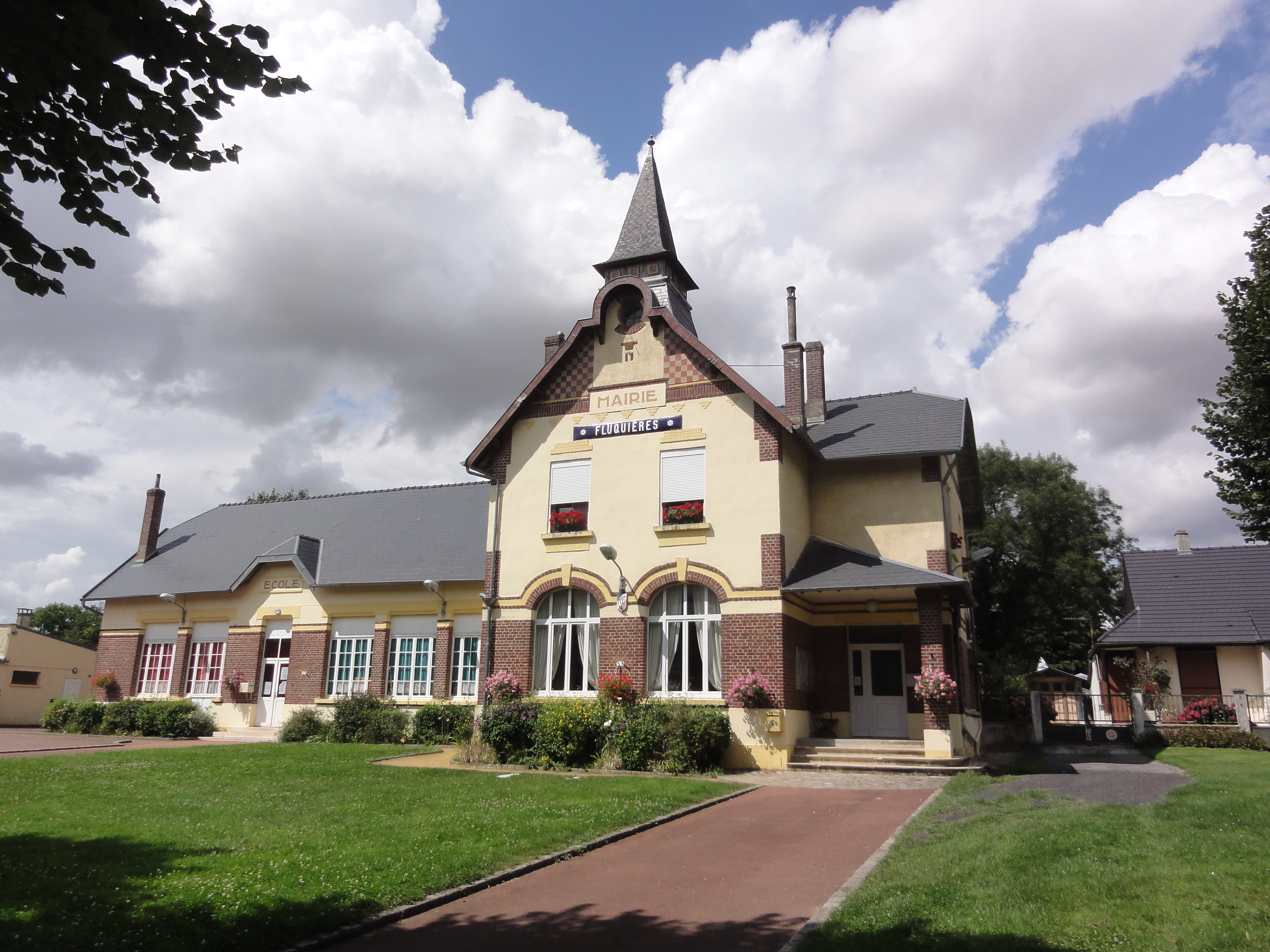
- The town hall and school of Fluquières
- Location of Fluquières
- Location within France Location within Hauts-de-France
- Coordinates: 49°48′14″N 3°09′13″E
- Country: France
- Region: Hauts-de-France
- Department: Aisne
- Arrondissement: Saint-Quentin
- Canton: Saint-Quentin-1
- Intercommunality: Pays du Vermandois

Government
  - Mayor (2026–32): Pascal Cordier
- Area^{1}: 5.24 km^{2} (2.02 sq mi)
- Elevation: 109 m (358 ft)
- Highest elevation: 101 m (331 ft)
- Lowest elevation: 82 m (269 ft)
- Population (2023): 194
  - Density: 37.0/km^{2} (95.9/sq mi)
- Time zone: UTC+01:00 (CET)
  - Summer (DST): UTC+02:00 (CEST)
- INSEE/Postal code: 02317 /02590
- ^{1} French Land Register data, which excludes lakes, ponds, glaciers > 1 km^{2} (0.386 sq mi or 247 acres) and river estuaries.

Fluquières (French pronunciation: [flykjɛʁ]) is a commune in the Aisne department in Hauts-de-France in northern France.

== Population ==
Historical population
Year	Pop.	±% p.a.
1968	200	—
1975	181	−1.42%
1982	189	+0.62%
1990	184	−0.33%
1999	197	+0.76%
2007	206	+0.56%
2012	214	+0.76%
2017	220	+0.55%
2023	194	−2.07%
Source: INSEE

== See also ==
- Communes of the Aisne department
