= Vaux-en-Vermandois =

- Commune
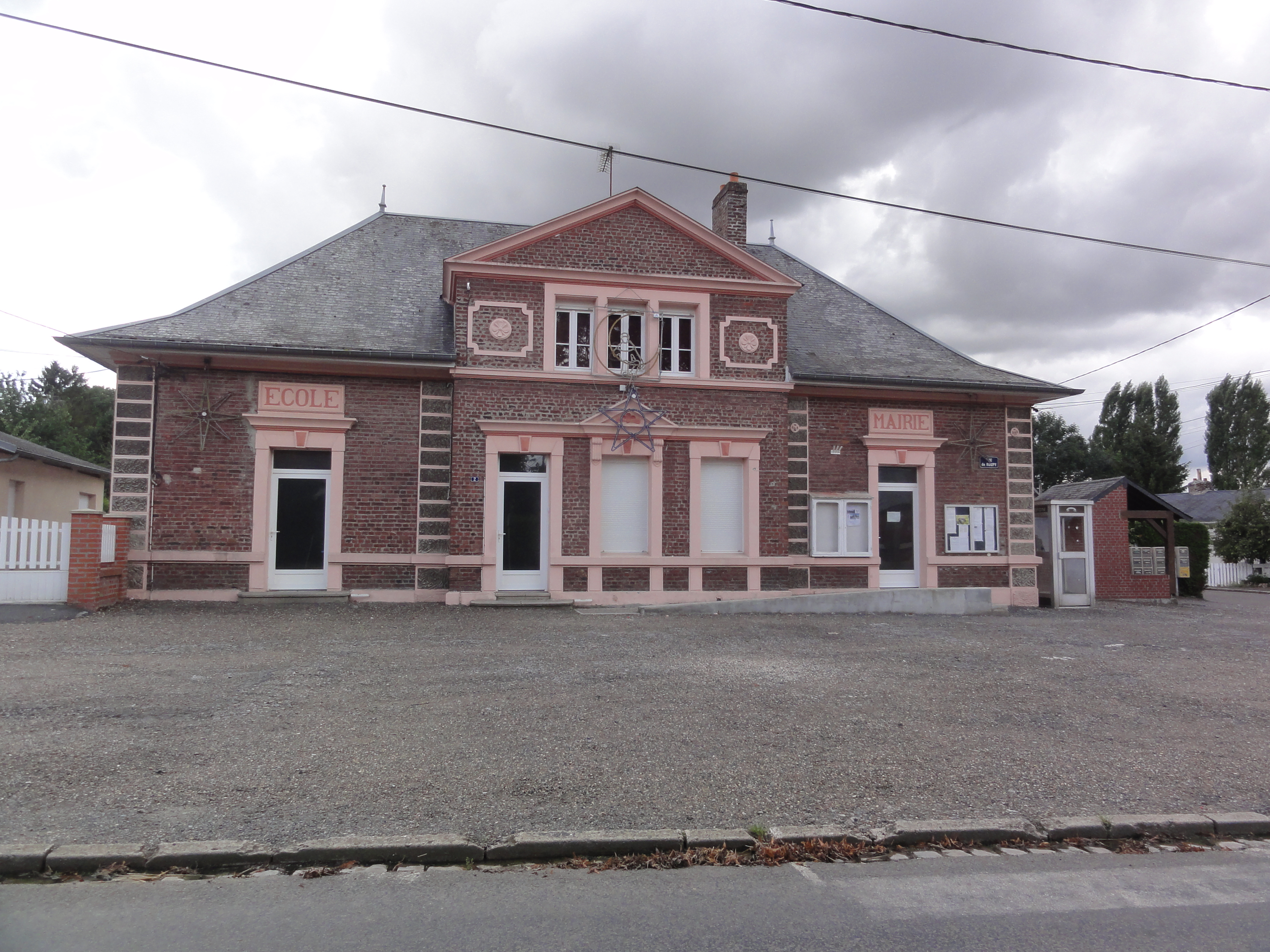
- The town hall and school of Vaux-en-Vermandois
- Location of Vaux-en-Vermandois
- Location within France Location within Hauts-de-France
- Coordinates: 49°49′23″N 3°08′25″E
- Country: France
- Region: Hauts-de-France
- Department: Aisne
- Arrondissement: Saint-Quentin
- Canton: Saint-Quentin-1
- Intercommunality: Pays du Vermandois

Government
  - Mayor (2026–32): Philippe Thomas
- Area^{1}: 3.85 km^{2} (1.49 sq mi)
- Elevation: 81 m (266 ft)
- Highest elevation: 99 m (325 ft)
- Lowest elevation: 75 m (246 ft)
- Population (2023): 142
  - Density: 36.9/km^{2} (95.5/sq mi)
- Time zone: UTC+01:00 (CET)
  - Summer (DST): UTC+02:00 (CEST)
- INSEE/Postal code: 02772 /02590
- ^{1} French Land Register data, which excludes lakes, ponds, glaciers > 1 km^{2} (0.386 sq mi or 247 acres) and river estuaries.

Vaux-en-Vermandois is a commune in the Aisne department in Hauts-de-France in northern France.

== Population ==
Historical population
Year	Pop.	±% p.a.
1968	176	—
1975	146	−2.63%
1982	130	−1.64%
1990	125	−0.49%
1999	131	+0.52%
2007	151	+1.79%
2012	130	−2.95%
2017	153	+3.31%
2023	142	−1.24%
Source: INSEE

== See also ==
- Communes of the Aisne department
