= Douchy, Aisne =

Douchy
- Commune
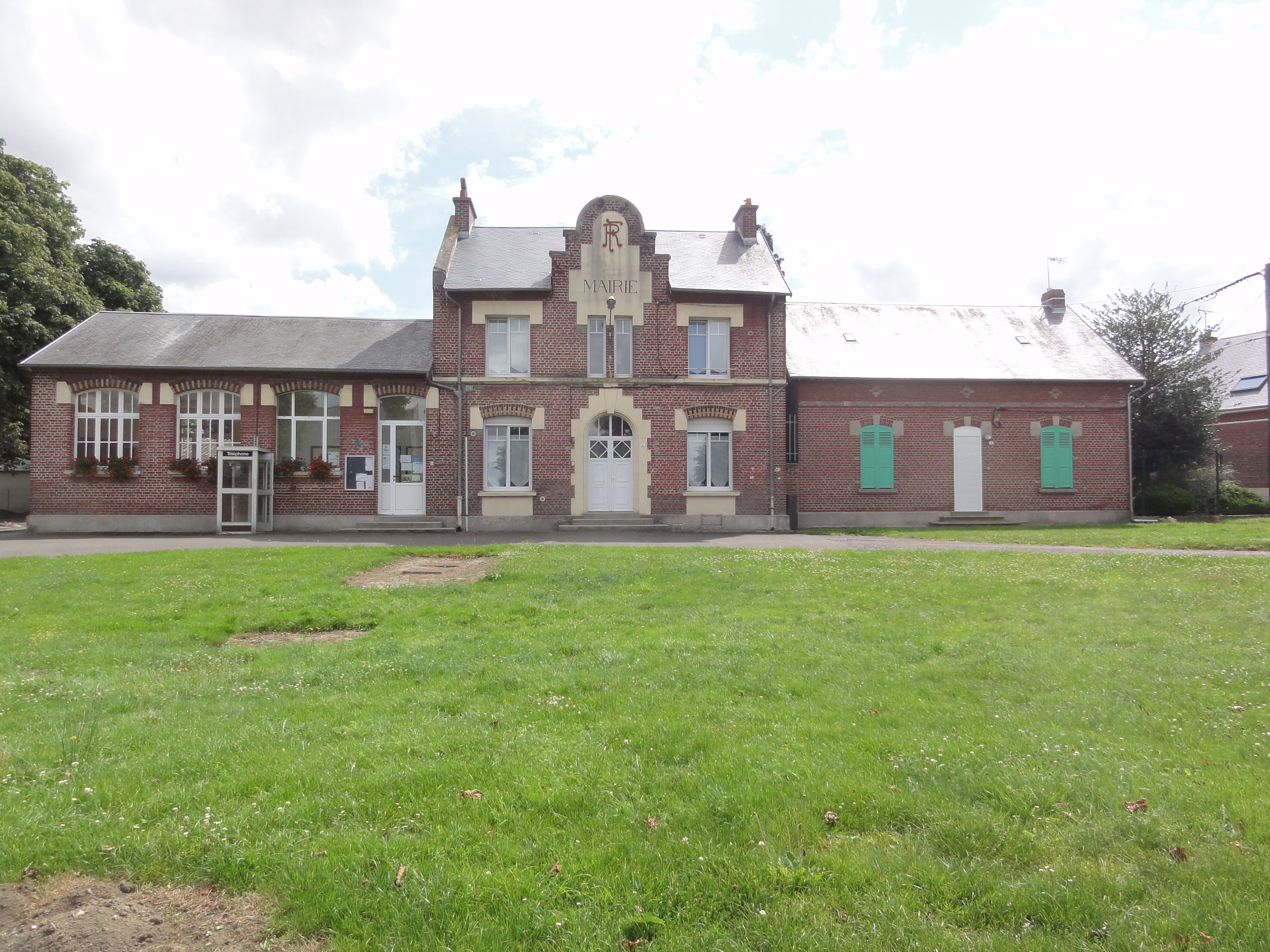
- The town hall of Douchy
- Location of Douchy
- Location within France Location within Hauts-de-France
- Coordinates: 49°47′47″N 3°08′09″E
- Country: France
- Region: Hauts-de-France
- Department: Aisne
- Arrondissement: Saint-Quentin
- Canton: Saint-Quentin-1
- Intercommunality: Pays du Vermandois

Government
  - Mayor (2026–32): Frédéric Capelle
- Area^{1}: 5.05 km^{2} (1.95 sq mi)
- Elevation: 97 m (318 ft)
- Highest elevation: 96 m (315 ft)
- Lowest elevation: 77 m (253 ft)
- Population (2023): 153
  - Density: 30.3/km^{2} (78.5/sq mi)
- Time zone: UTC+01:00 (CET)
  - Summer (DST): UTC+02:00 (CEST)
- INSEE/Postal code: 02270 /02590
- ^{1} French Land Register data, which excludes lakes, ponds, glaciers > 1 km^{2} (0.386 sq mi or 247 acres) and river estuaries.

Douchy (French pronunciation: [duʃi]) is a commune in the Aisne department in Hauts-de-France in northern France.

== Population ==
Historical population
Year	Pop.	±% p.a.
1968	193	—
1975	184	−0.68%
1982	147	−3.16%
1990	152	+0.42%
1999	150	−0.15%
2007	143	−0.60%
2012	152	+1.23%
2017	162	+1.28%
2023	153	−0.95%
Source: INSEE

== See also ==
- Communes of the Aisne department
