= Roupy =

- Commune
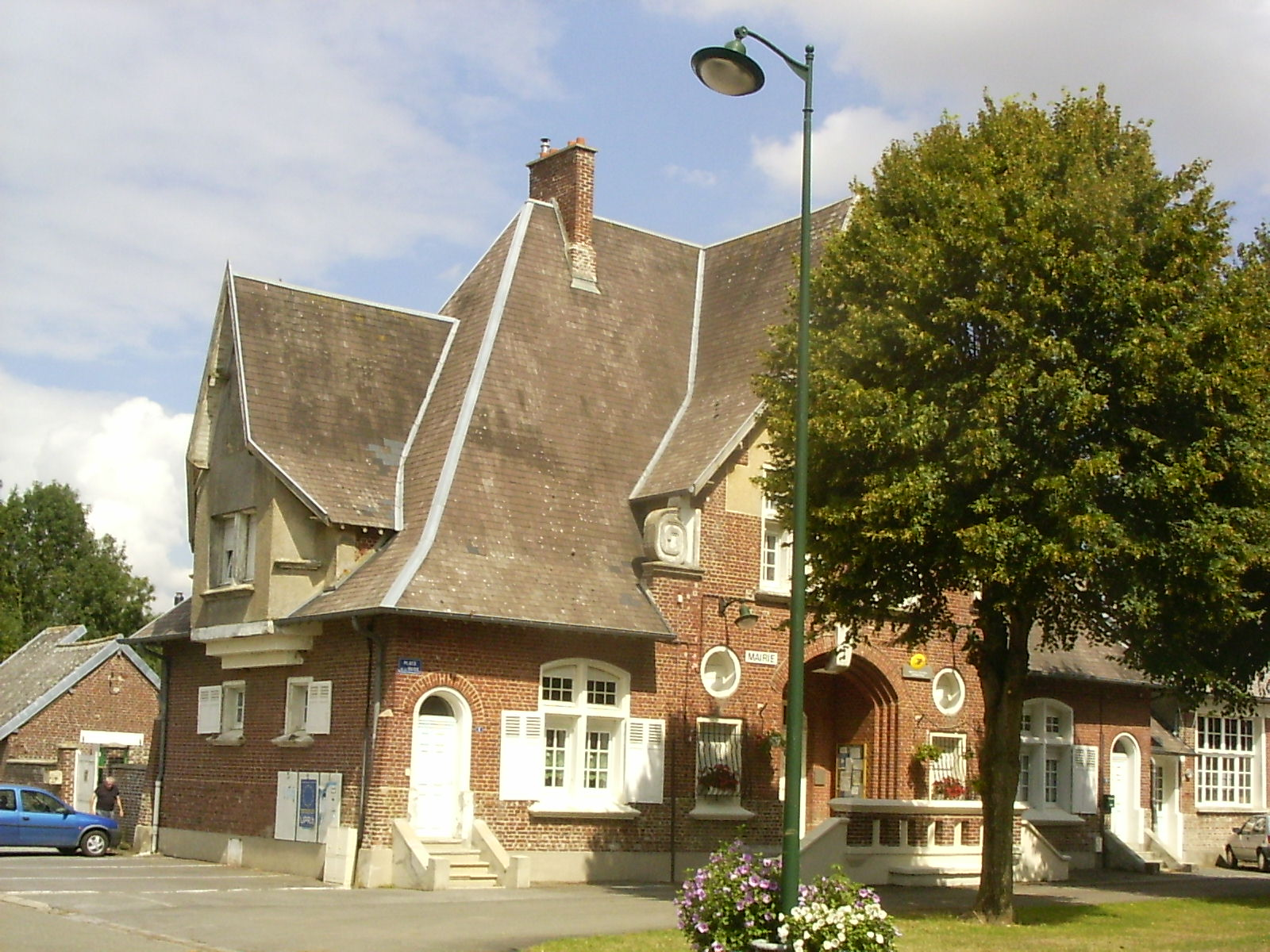
- The town hall of Roupy
- Location of Roupy
- Location within France Location within Hauts-de-France
- Coordinates: 49°48′46″N 3°11′03″E
- Country: France
- Region: Hauts-de-France
- Department: Aisne
- Arrondissement: Saint-Quentin
- Canton: Saint-Quentin-1
- Intercommunality: Pays du Vermandois

Government
  - Mayor (2026–32): Fabrice Grenglet
- Area^{1}: 5.9 km^{2} (2.3 sq mi)
- Elevation: 93 m (305 ft)
- Highest elevation: 102 m (335 ft)
- Lowest elevation: 79 m (259 ft)
- Population (2023): 237
  - Density: 40/km^{2} (100/sq mi)
- Time zone: UTC+01:00 (CET)
  - Summer (DST): UTC+02:00 (CEST)
- INSEE/Postal code: 02658 /02590
- ^{1} French Land Register data, which excludes lakes, ponds, glaciers > 1 km^{2} (0.386 sq mi or 247 acres) and river estuaries.

Roupy (French pronunciation: [ʁupi]) is a commune in the Aisne department in Hauts-de-France in northern France.

== Population ==
Historical population
Year	Pop.	±% p.a.
1968	255	—
1975	244	−0.63%
1982	240	−0.24%
1990	295	+2.61%
1999	262	−1.31%
2007	249	−0.63%
2012	229	−1.66%
2017	230	+0.09%
2023	237	+0.50%
Source: INSEE

== See also ==
- Communes of the Aisne department
