= Beauvois-en-Vermandois =

- Commune
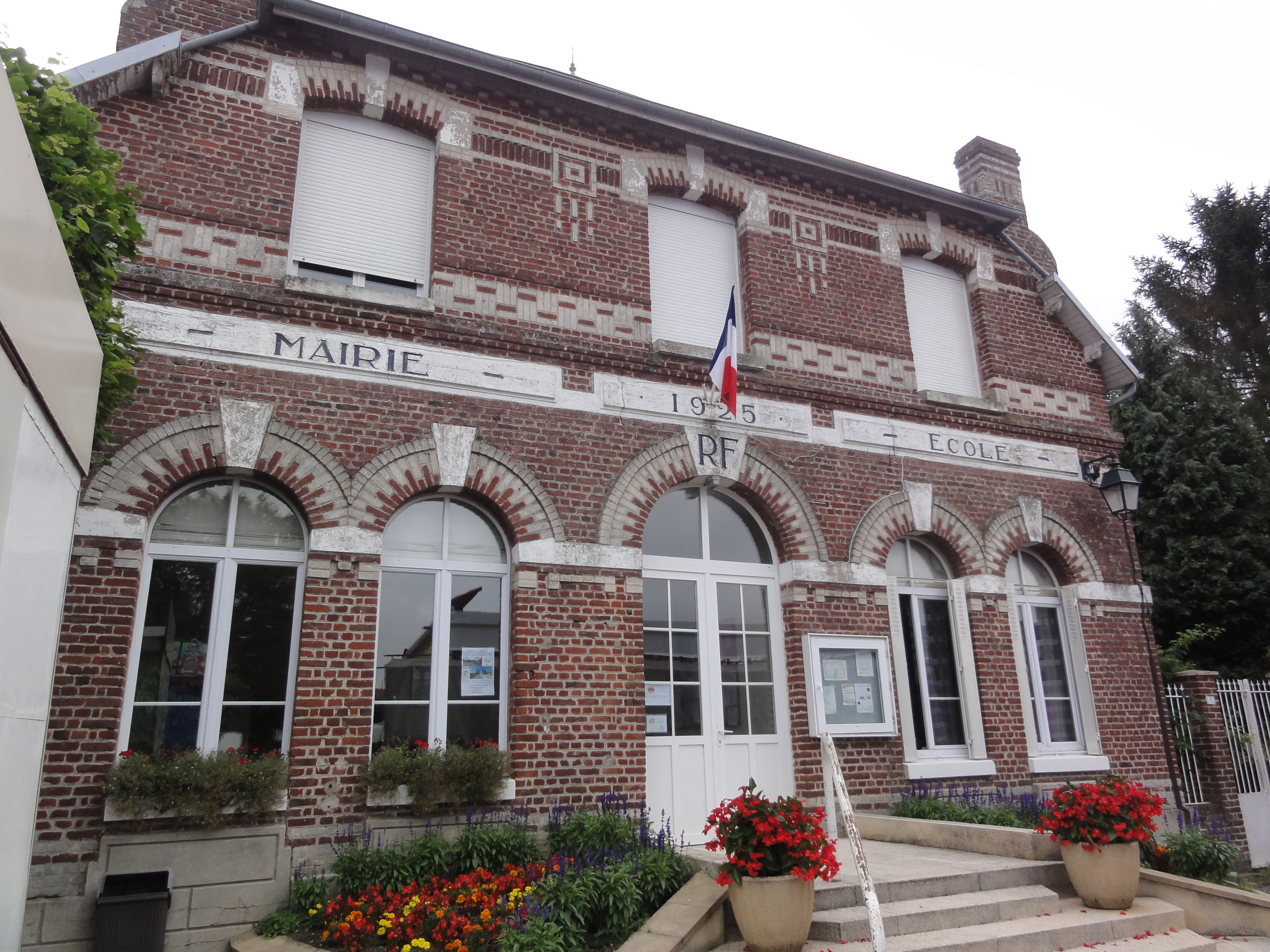
- Town hall and school

- Coat of arms
- Location of Beauvois-en-Vermandois
- Location within France Location within Hauts-de-France
- Coordinates: 49°50′23″N 3°06′16″E
- Country: France
- Region: Hauts-de-France
- Department: Aisne
- Arrondissement: Saint-Quentin
- Canton: Saint-Quentin-1
- Intercommunality: Pays du Vermandois

Government
  - Mayor (2026–32): Bruno Lefevre
- Area^{1}: 7.51 km^{2} (2.90 sq mi)
- Elevation: 92 m (302 ft)
- Highest elevation: 95 m (312 ft)
- Lowest elevation: 75 m (246 ft)
- Population (2023): 263
  - Density: 35.0/km^{2} (90.7/sq mi)
- Time zone: UTC+01:00 (CET)
  - Summer (DST): UTC+02:00 (CEST)
- INSEE/Postal code: 02060 /02590
- ^{1} French Land Register data, which excludes lakes, ponds, glaciers > 1 km^{2} (0.386 sq mi or 247 acres) and river estuaries.

Beauvois-en-Vermandois (Picard: Bieuvos-in-Vermindoés) is a commune in the department of Aisne in Hauts-de-France in northern France.

== Population ==
Historical population
Year	Pop.	±% p.a.
1968	261	—
1975	275	+0.75%
1982	258	−0.91%
1990	304	+2.07%
1999	306	+0.07%
2007	280	−1.10%
2012	282	+0.14%
2017	268	−1.01%
2023	263	−0.31%
Source: INSEE

== See also ==
- Communes of the Aisne department
