= Vendelles =

- Commune
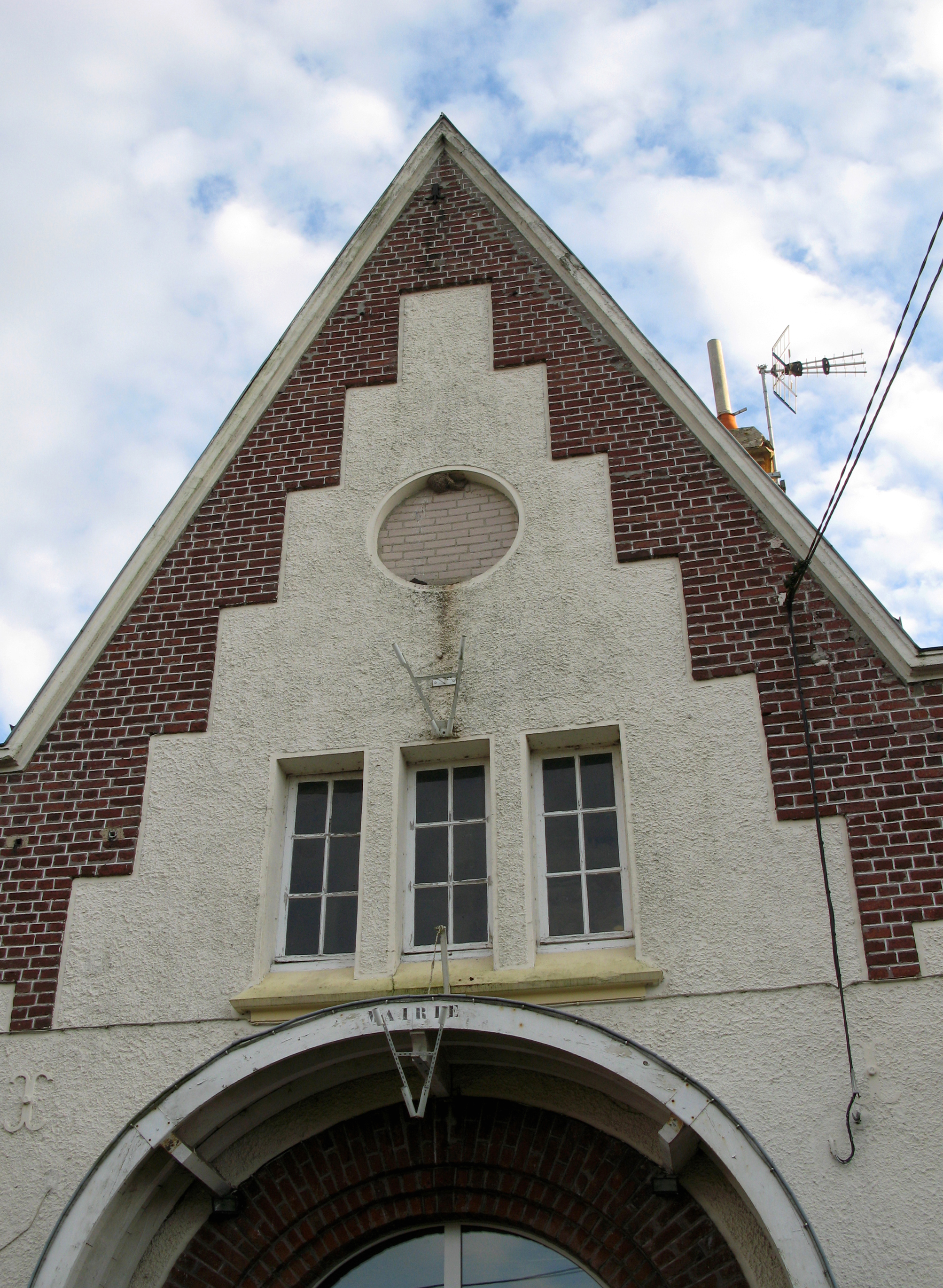
- The front of the town hall in Vendelles
- Location of Vendelles
- Location within France Location within Hauts-de-France
- Coordinates: 49°54′41″N 3°08′15″E
- Country: France
- Region: Hauts-de-France
- Department: Aisne
- Arrondissement: Saint-Quentin
- Canton: Saint-Quentin-1
- Intercommunality: Pays du Vermandois

Government
  - Mayor (2026–32): Stéphane Pruvost
- Area^{1}: 5.28 km^{2} (2.04 sq mi)
- Elevation: 120 m (390 ft)
- Highest elevation: 123 m (404 ft)
- Lowest elevation: 78 m (256 ft)
- Population (2023): 123
  - Density: 23.3/km^{2} (60.3/sq mi)
- Time zone: UTC+01:00 (CET)
  - Summer (DST): UTC+02:00 (CEST)
- INSEE/Postal code: 02774 /02490
- ^{1} French Land Register data, which excludes lakes, ponds, glaciers > 1 km^{2} (0.386 sq mi or 247 acres) and river estuaries.

Vendelles (French pronunciation: [vɑ̃dɛl]) is a commune in the Aisne department in Hauts-de-France in northern France.

== Population ==
Historical population
Year	Pop.	±% p.a.
1968	139	—
1975	129	−1.06%
1982	119	−1.15%
1990	121	+0.21%
1999	127	+0.54%
2007	108	−2.01%
2012	110	+0.37%
2017	117	+1.24%
2023	123	+0.84%
Source: INSEE

== See also ==
- Communes of the Aisne department
