= Holnon =

- Commune
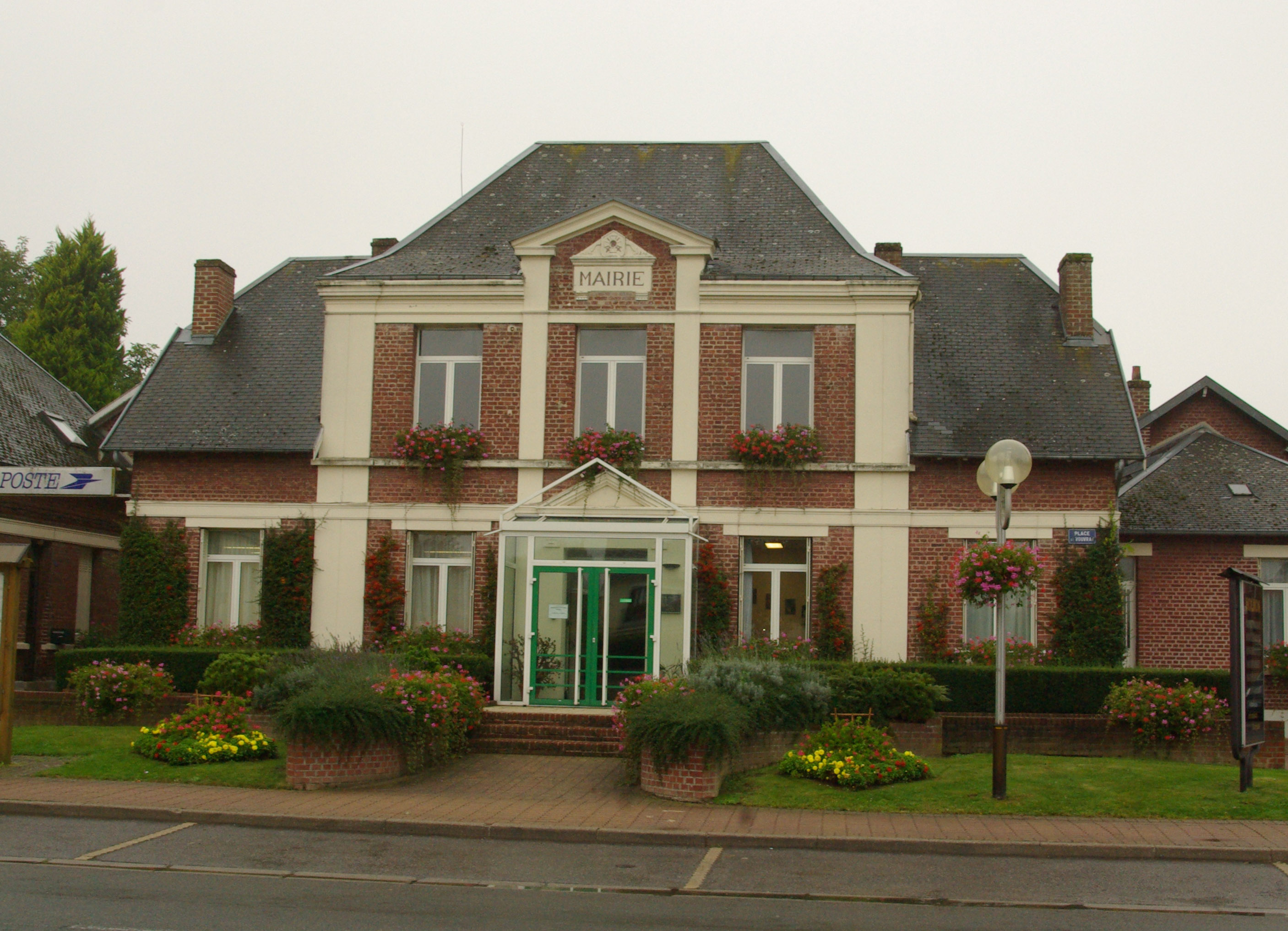
- Town hall
- Location of Holnon
- Location within France Location within Hauts-de-France
- Coordinates: 49°51′34″N 3°12′48″E
- Country: France
- Region: Hauts-de-France
- Department: Aisne
- Arrondissement: Saint-Quentin
- Canton: Saint-Quentin-1

Government
  - Mayor (2026–32): Florent Risbourg
- Area^{1}: 6.37 km^{2} (2.46 sq mi)
- Elevation: 109 m (358 ft)
- Highest elevation: 141 m (463 ft)
- Lowest elevation: 85 m (279 ft)
- Population (2023): 1,343
  - Density: 211/km^{2} (546/sq mi)
- Demonym: Holnonais·e
- Time zone: UTC+01:00 (CET)
  - Summer (DST): UTC+02:00 (CEST)
- INSEE/Postal code: 02382 /02760
- ^{1} French Land Register data, which excludes lakes, ponds, glaciers > 1 km^{2} (0.386 sq mi or 247 acres) and river estuaries.

Holnon (French pronunciation: [ɔlnɔ̃]) is a commune in the Aisne department, Hauts-de-France, northern France.

== Population ==
Historical population
Year	Pop.	±% p.a.
1968	414	—
1975	1,231	+16.84%
1982	1,216	−0.17%
1990	1,199	−0.18%
1999	1,334	+1.19%
2007	1,369	+0.32%
2012	1,414	+0.65%
2017	1,387	−0.38%
2023	1,343	−0.54%
Source: INSEE

== See also ==
- Communes of the Aisne department
