= 02467 =

02467 may refer to:

- Chestnut Hill, Massachusetts, U.S., a village
- Marizy-Saint-Mard, a commune in Hauts-de-France, France
- Bhokar, a town in Maharashtra, India (by telephone code)
