= Launoy =

Launoy can mean:

- Launoy, Aisne, commune in the Aisne department, France
- People:
  - Jean de Launoy (1603-1678), a French historian
  - Christian de Launoy, a French naturalist, alive in 1783
