= Cuiry-Housse =

- Commune
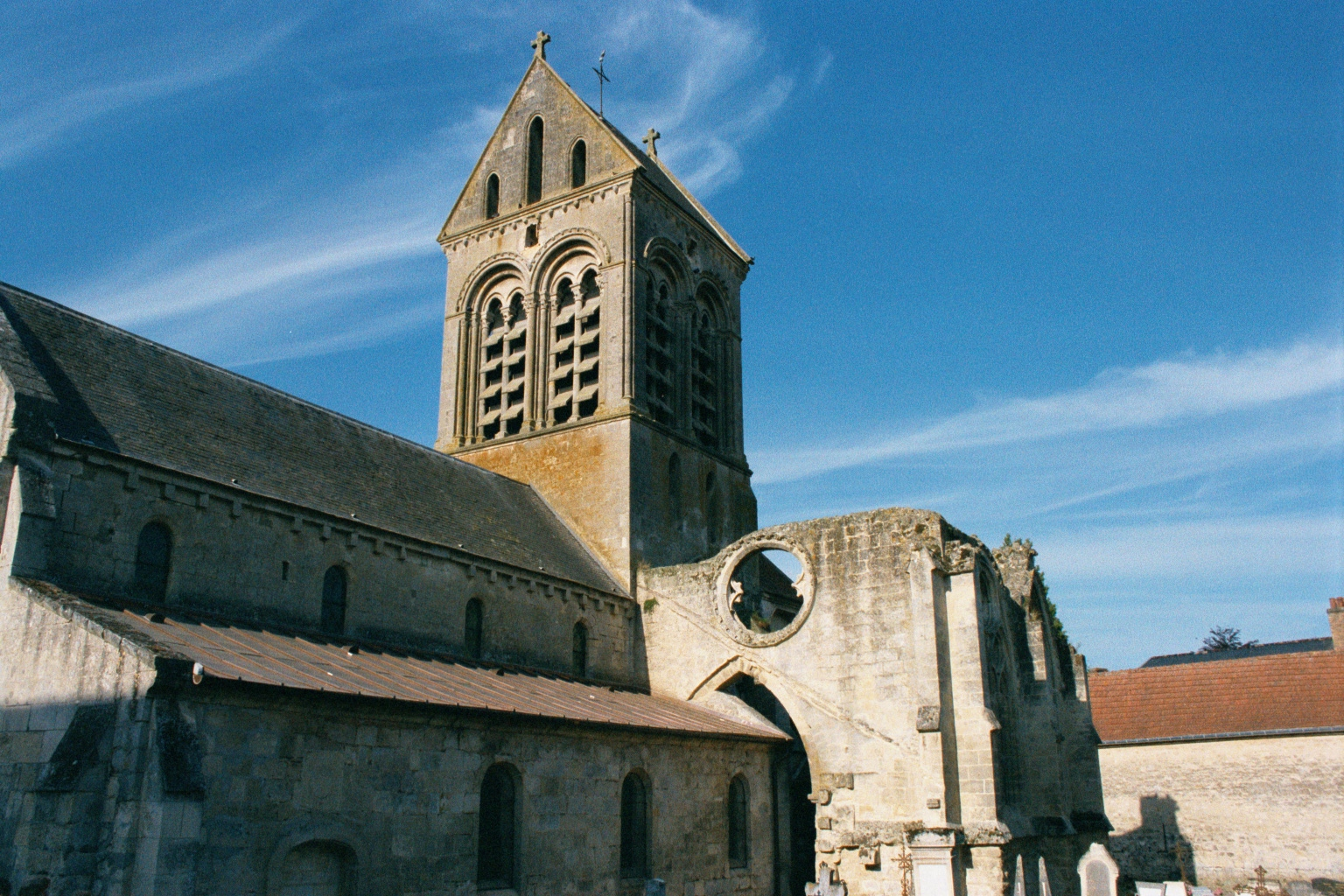
- The 12th century church of Cuiry-Housse
- Location of Cuiry-Housse
- Location within France Location within Hauts-de-France
- Coordinates: 49°17′44″N 3°29′35″E
- Country: France
- Region: Hauts-de-France
- Department: Aisne
- Arrondissement: Soissons
- Canton: Villers-Cotterêts
- Intercommunality: Oulchy le Château

Government
  - Mayor (2026–32): Baptiste Boucher
- Area^{1}: 8.54 km^{2} (3.30 sq mi)
- Elevation: 140 m (460 ft)
- Highest elevation: 149 m (489 ft)
- Lowest elevation: 83 m (272 ft)
- Population (2023): 102
  - Density: 11.9/km^{2} (30.9/sq mi)
- Time zone: UTC+01:00 (CET)
  - Summer (DST): UTC+02:00 (CEST)
- INSEE/Postal code: 02249 /02220
- ^{1} French Land Register data, which excludes lakes, ponds, glaciers > 1 km^{2} (0.386 sq mi or 247 acres) and river estuaries.

Cuiry-Housse (French pronunciation: [kɥiʁi us]) is a commune in the Aisne department in Hauts-de-France in northern France.

== Population ==
Historical population
| Year | Pop. | ±% p.a. |
|---|---|---|
| 1968 | 155 | — |
| 1975 | 143 | −1.14% |
| 1982 | 117 | −2.83% |
| 1990 | 99 | −2.07% |
| 1999 | 110 | +1.18% |
| 2007 | 108 | −0.23% |
| 2012 | 112 | +0.73% |
| 2017 | 102 | −1.85% |
| 2023 | 102 | +0.00% |
Source: INSEE

== See also ==
- Communes of the Aisne department
