= Sommelans =

- Commune
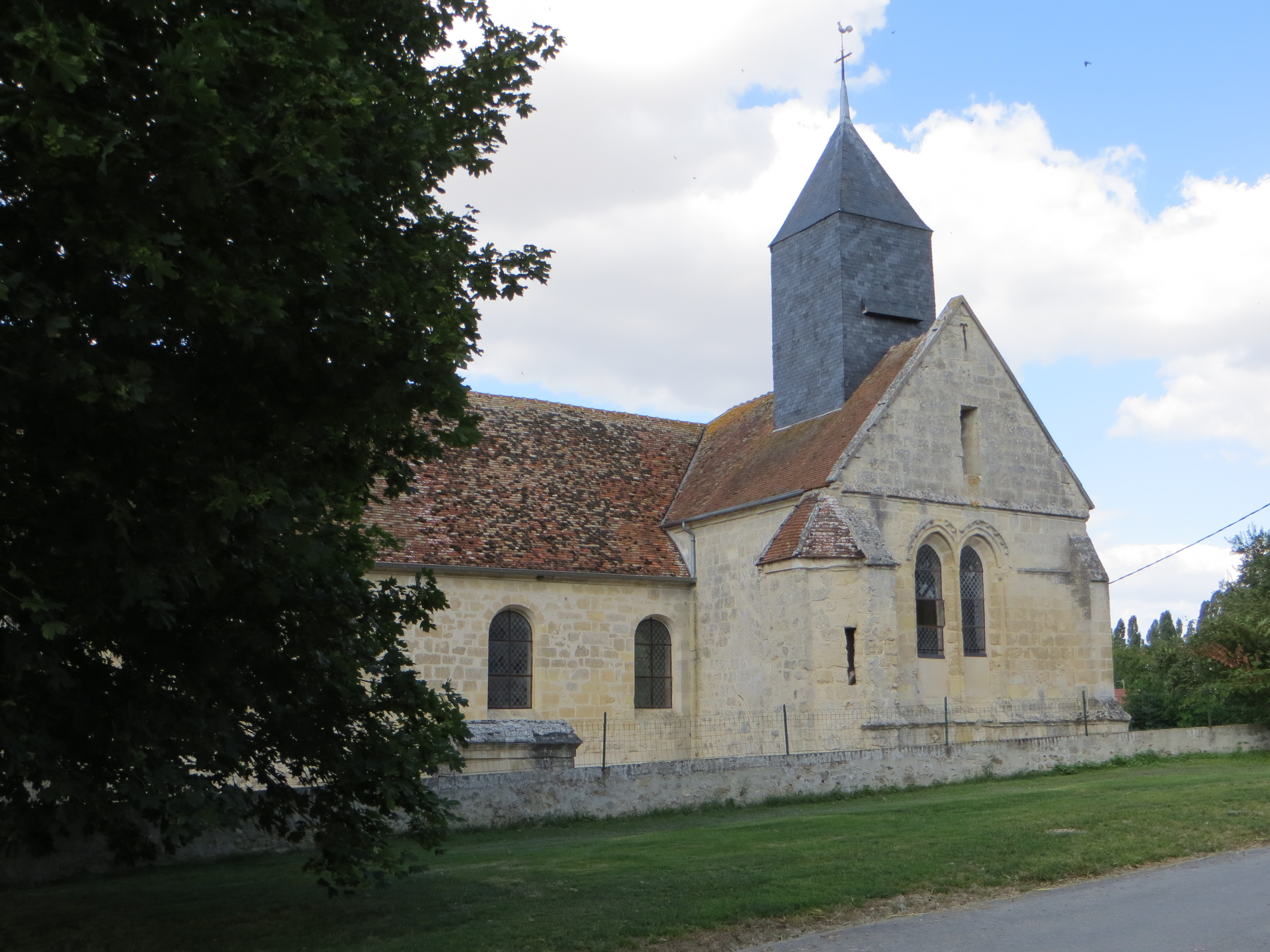
- The church of Sommelans
- Location of Sommelans
- Location within France Location within Hauts-de-France
- Coordinates: 49°08′20″N 3°17′38″E
- Country: France
- Region: Hauts-de-France
- Department: Aisne
- Arrondissement: Château-Thierry
- Canton: Villers-Cotterêts
- Intercommunality: CA Région de Château-Thierry

Government
  - Mayor (2026–32): Jean-Marc Delerue
- Area^{1}: 4.28 km^{2} (1.65 sq mi)
- Elevation: 150 m (490 ft)
- Highest elevation: 181 m (594 ft)
- Lowest elevation: 127 m (417 ft)
- Population (2023): 56
  - Density: 13/km^{2} (34/sq mi)
- Time zone: UTC+01:00 (CET)
  - Summer (DST): UTC+02:00 (CEST)
- INSEE/Postal code: 02724 /02470
- ^{1} French Land Register data, which excludes lakes, ponds, glaciers > 1 km^{2} (0.386 sq mi or 247 acres) and river estuaries.

Sommelans is a commune in the Aisne department in Hauts-de-France in northern France.

== Population ==
Historical population
Year	Pop.	±% p.a.
1968	51	—
1975	50	−0.28%
1982	44	−1.81%
1990	50	+1.61%
1999	54	+0.86%
2007	55	+0.23%
2012	61	+2.09%
2017	61	+0.00%
2023	56	−1.42%
Source: INSEE

== See also ==
- Communes of the Aisne department
