= Nampteuil-sous-Muret =

- Commune
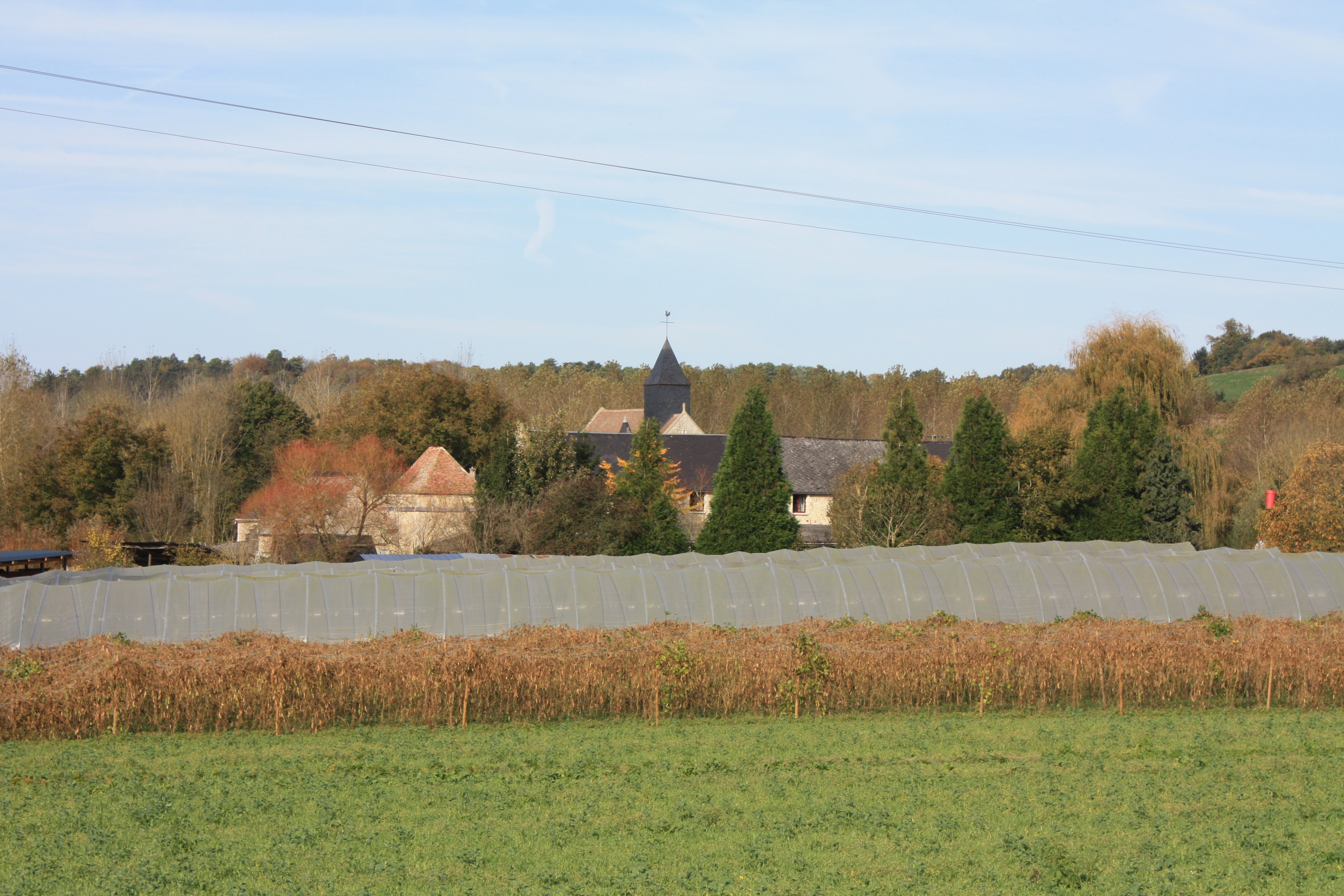
- A general view of Nampteuil-sous-Muret
- Location of Nampteuil-sous-Muret
- Location within France Location within Hauts-de-France
- Coordinates: 49°18′05″N 3°25′33″E
- Country: France
- Region: Hauts-de-France
- Department: Aisne
- Arrondissement: Soissons
- Canton: Villers-Cotterêts
- Intercommunality: Oulchy le Château

Government
  - Mayor (2026–32): Pascal Roy
- Area^{1}: 3.38 km^{2} (1.31 sq mi)
- Elevation: 87 m (285 ft)
- Highest elevation: 171 m (561 ft)
- Lowest elevation: 72 m (236 ft)
- Population (2023): 88
  - Density: 26/km^{2} (67/sq mi)
- Time zone: UTC+01:00 (CET)
  - Summer (DST): UTC+02:00 (CEST)
- INSEE/Postal code: 02536 /02200
- ^{1} French Land Register data, which excludes lakes, ponds, glaciers > 1 km^{2} (0.386 sq mi or 247 acres) and river estuaries.

Nampteuil-sous-Muret (French pronunciation: [nɑ̃tœj su myʁɛ], literally Nampteuil under Muret) is a commune in the Aisne department in Hauts-de-France in northern France.

== Population ==
Historical population
Year	Pop.	±% p.a.
1968	99	—
1975	83	−2.49%
1982	86	+0.51%
1990	102	+2.16%
1999	76	−3.22%
2007	77	+0.16%
2012	93	+3.85%
2017	103	+2.06%
2023	88	−2.59%
Source: INSEE

== See also ==
- Communes of the Aisne department
