= Licy-Clignon =

- Commune
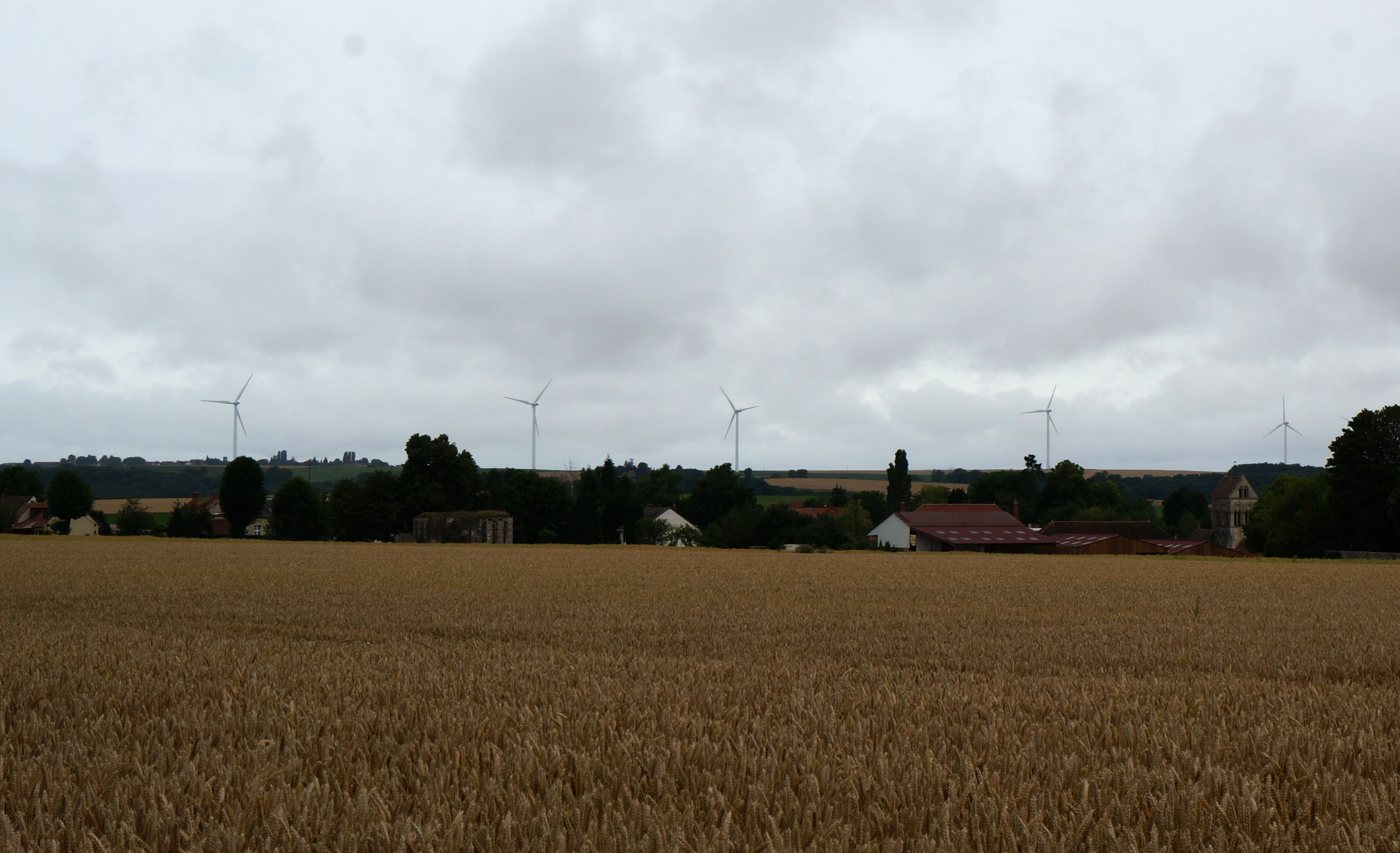
- The wind farm of Ourcq and Clignon
- Location of Licy-Clignon
- Location within France Location within Hauts-de-France
- Coordinates: 49°06′03″N 3°16′29″E
- Country: France
- Region: Hauts-de-France
- Department: Aisne
- Arrondissement: Château-Thierry
- Canton: Villers-Cotterêts
- Intercommunality: CA Région de Château-Thierry

Government
  - Mayor (2026–32): Jean-Étienne Juillet
- Area^{1}: 4.09 km^{2} (1.58 sq mi)
- Elevation: 91 m (299 ft)
- Highest elevation: 165 m (541 ft)
- Lowest elevation: 80 m (260 ft)
- Population (2023): 65
  - Density: 16/km^{2} (41/sq mi)
- Time zone: UTC+01:00 (CET)
  - Summer (DST): UTC+02:00 (CEST)
- INSEE/Postal code: 02428 /02810
- ^{1} French Land Register data, which excludes lakes, ponds, glaciers > 1 km^{2} (0.386 sq mi or 247 acres) and river estuaries.

Licy-Clignon (French pronunciation: [lisi kliɲɔ̃]) is a commune in the Aisne department in Hauts-de-France in northern France.

== Population ==
Historical population
Year	Pop.	±% p.a.
1968	40	—
1975	41	+0.35%
1982	42	+0.34%
1990	63	+5.20%
1999	80	+2.69%
2007	89	+1.34%
2012	82	−1.62%
2017	74	−2.03%
2023	65	−2.14%
Source: INSEE

== See also ==
- Communes of the Aisne department
