= Breny =

- Commune
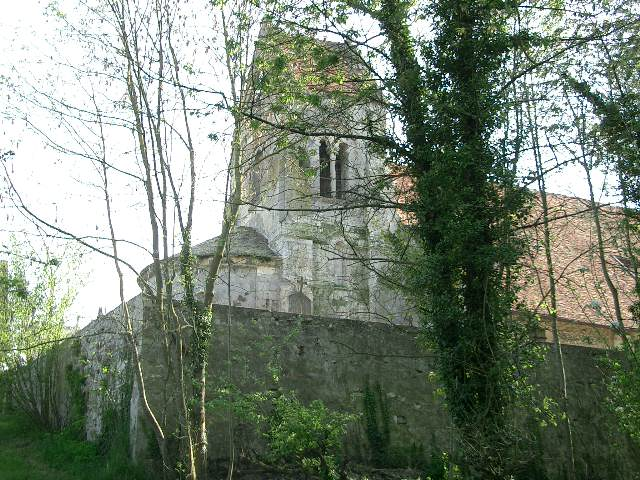
- The church of Breny
- Location of Breny
- Location within France Location within Hauts-de-France
- Coordinates: 49°11′11″N 3°21′13″E
- Country: France
- Region: Hauts-de-France
- Department: Aisne
- Arrondissement: Soissons
- Canton: Villers-Cotterêts
- Intercommunality: Oulchy-le-Château

Government
  - Mayor (2026–32): Aurélie Coudrain
- Area^{1}: 4.52 km^{2} (1.75 sq mi)
- Elevation: 87 m (285 ft)
- Highest elevation: 155 m (509 ft)
- Lowest elevation: 82 m (269 ft)
- Population (2023): 210
  - Density: 46/km^{2} (120/sq mi)
- Time zone: UTC+01:00 (CET)
  - Summer (DST): UTC+02:00 (CEST)
- INSEE/Postal code: 02121 /02210
- ^{1} French Land Register data, which excludes lakes, ponds, glaciers > 1 km^{2} (0.386 sq mi or 247 acres) and river estuaries.

Breny is a commune in the department of Aisne in Hauts-de-France in northern France.

== Population ==
Historical population
Year	Pop.	±% p.a.
1968	260	—
1975	250	−0.56%
1982	219	−1.87%
1990	212	−0.41%
1999	238	+1.29%
2007	272	+1.68%
2012	257	−1.13%
2017	244	−1.03%
2023	210	−2.47%
Source: INSEE

== See also ==
- Communes of the Aisne department
