= Marizy-Sainte-Geneviève =

- Commune
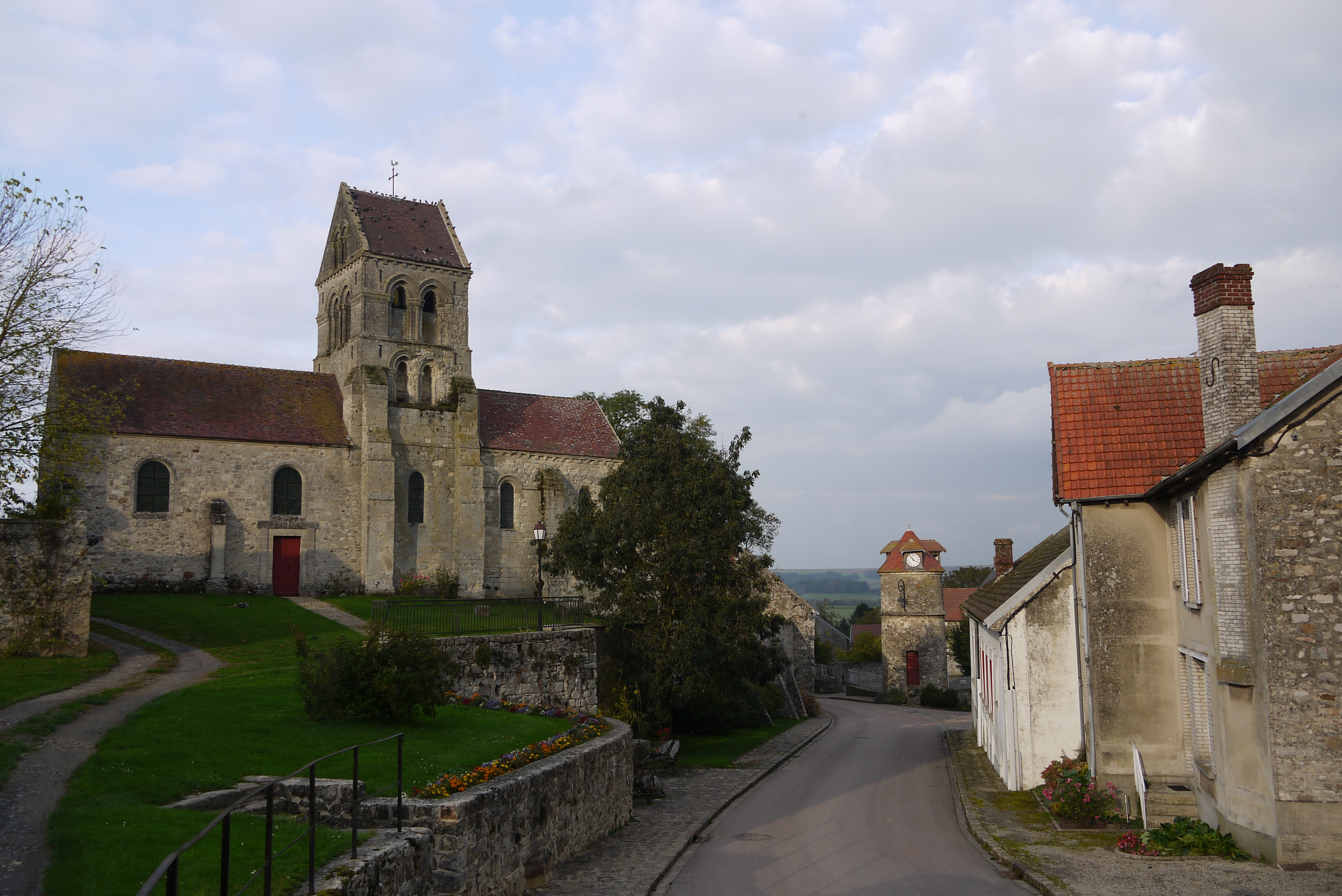
- The church of Marizy-Sainte-Geneviève
- Location of Marizy-Sainte-Geneviève
- Location within France Location within Hauts-de-France
- Coordinates: 49°11′01″N 3°12′10″E
- Country: France
- Region: Hauts-de-France
- Department: Aisne
- Arrondissement: Soissons
- Canton: Villers-Cotterêts

Government
  - Mayor (2026–32): Nicolas Bahu
- Area^{1}: 7.71 km^{2} (2.98 sq mi)
- Elevation: 79 m (259 ft)
- Highest elevation: 157 m (515 ft)
- Lowest elevation: 67 m (220 ft)
- Population (2023): 125
  - Density: 16.2/km^{2} (42.0/sq mi)
- Time zone: UTC+01:00 (CET)
  - Summer (DST): UTC+02:00 (CEST)
- INSEE/Postal code: 02466 /02470
- ^{1} French Land Register data, which excludes lakes, ponds, glaciers > 1 km^{2} (0.386 sq mi or 247 acres) and river estuaries.

Marizy-Sainte-Geneviève is a commune in the Aisne department in Hauts-de-France in northern France.

== Population ==
Historical population
Year	Pop.	±% p.a.
1968	167	—
1975	120	−4.61%
1982	114	−0.73%
1990	98	−1.87%
1999	124	+2.65%
2007	130	+0.59%
2012	130	+0.00%
2017	130	+0.00%
2023	125	−0.65%
Source: INSEE

== See also ==
- Communes of the Aisne department
