= Maast-et-Violaine =

- Commune
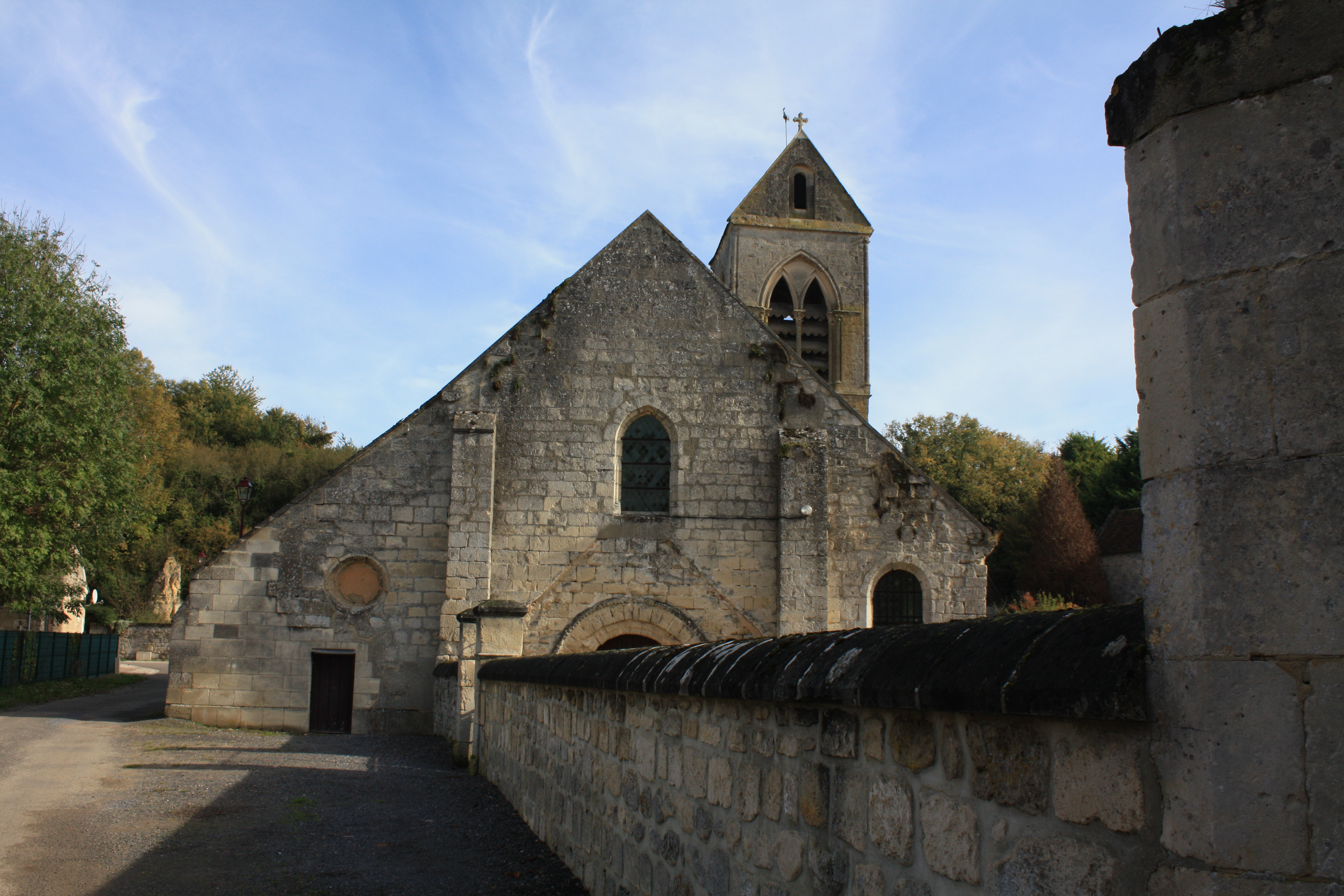
- The church of Maast-et-Violaine
- Location of Maast-et-Violaine
- Location within France Location within Hauts-de-France
- Coordinates: 49°17′03″N 3°26′58″E
- Country: France
- Region: Hauts-de-France
- Department: Aisne
- Arrondissement: Soissons
- Canton: Villers-Cotterêts
- Intercommunality: Canton d'Oulchy-le-Château

Government
  - Mayor (2026–32): Guillaume Deville
- Area^{1}: 10.96 km^{2} (4.23 sq mi)
- Elevation: 98 m (322 ft)
- Highest elevation: 154 m (505 ft)
- Lowest elevation: 78 m (256 ft)
- Population (2023): 126
  - Density: 11.5/km^{2} (29.8/sq mi)
- Time zone: UTC+01:00 (CET)
  - Summer (DST): UTC+02:00 (CEST)
- INSEE/Postal code: 02447 /02220
- ^{1} French Land Register data, which excludes lakes, ponds, glaciers > 1 km^{2} (0.386 sq mi or 247 acres) and river estuaries.

Maast-et-Violaine is a commune in the Aisne department in Hauts-de-France in northern France.

== Population ==
Historical population
Year	Pop.	±% p.a.
1968	194	—
1975	143	−4.26%
1982	159	+1.53%
1990	157	−0.16%
1999	155	−0.14%
2007	160	+0.40%
2012	151	−1.15%
2017	147	−0.54%
2023	126	−2.54%
Source: INSEE

== See also ==
- Communes of the Aisne department
