= Monnes =

- Commune
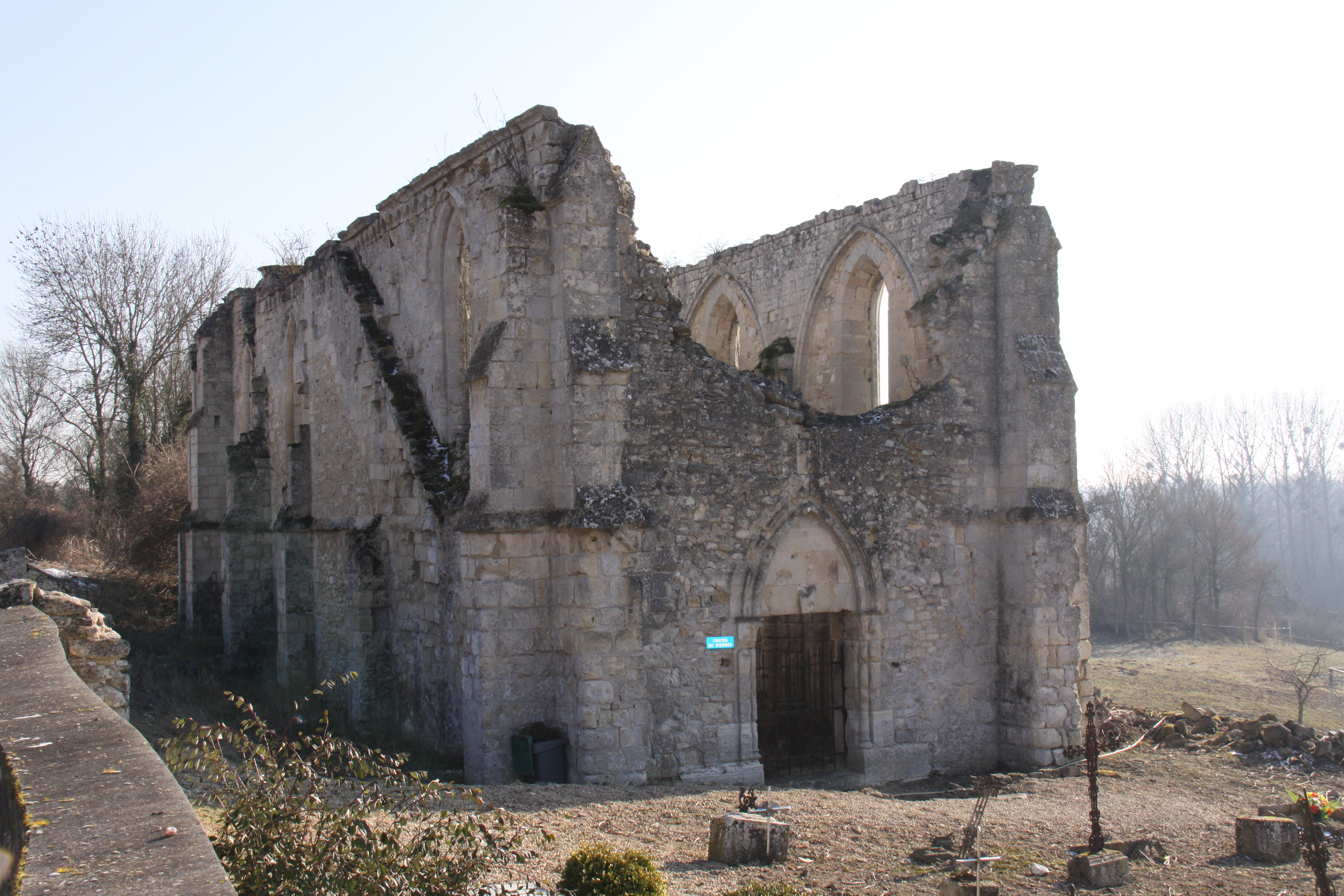
- The ruined church in Monnes
- Location of Monnes
- Location within France Location within Hauts-de-France
- Coordinates: 49°08′56″N 3°13′11″E
- Country: France
- Region: Hauts-de-France
- Department: Aisne
- Arrondissement: Soissons
- Canton: Villers-Cotterêts

Government
  - Mayor (2026–32): Richard Aubert
- Area^{1}: 4.92 km^{2} (1.90 sq mi)
- Elevation: 115 m (377 ft)
- Highest elevation: 167 m (548 ft)
- Lowest elevation: 107 m (351 ft)
- Population (2023): 90
  - Density: 18/km^{2} (47/sq mi)
- Time zone: UTC+01:00 (CET)
  - Summer (DST): UTC+02:00 (CEST)
- INSEE/Postal code: 02496 /02470
- ^{1} French Land Register data, which excludes lakes, ponds, glaciers > 1 km^{2} (0.386 sq mi or 247 acres) and river estuaries.

Monnes is a commune in the Aisne department in Hauts-de-France in northern France. The village is situated 55 kilometers (34.2 miles) away from Laon, the department capital of Aisne.

== Population ==
Historical population
Year	Pop.	±% p.a.
1968	126	—
1975	108	−2.18%
1982	93	−2.11%
1990	84	−1.26%
1999	70	−2.01%
2007	93	+3.62%
2012	124	+5.92%
2017	104	−3.46%
2023	90	−2.38%
Source: INSEE

== See also ==
- Communes of the Aisne department
