= Noroy-sur-Ourcq =

- Commune
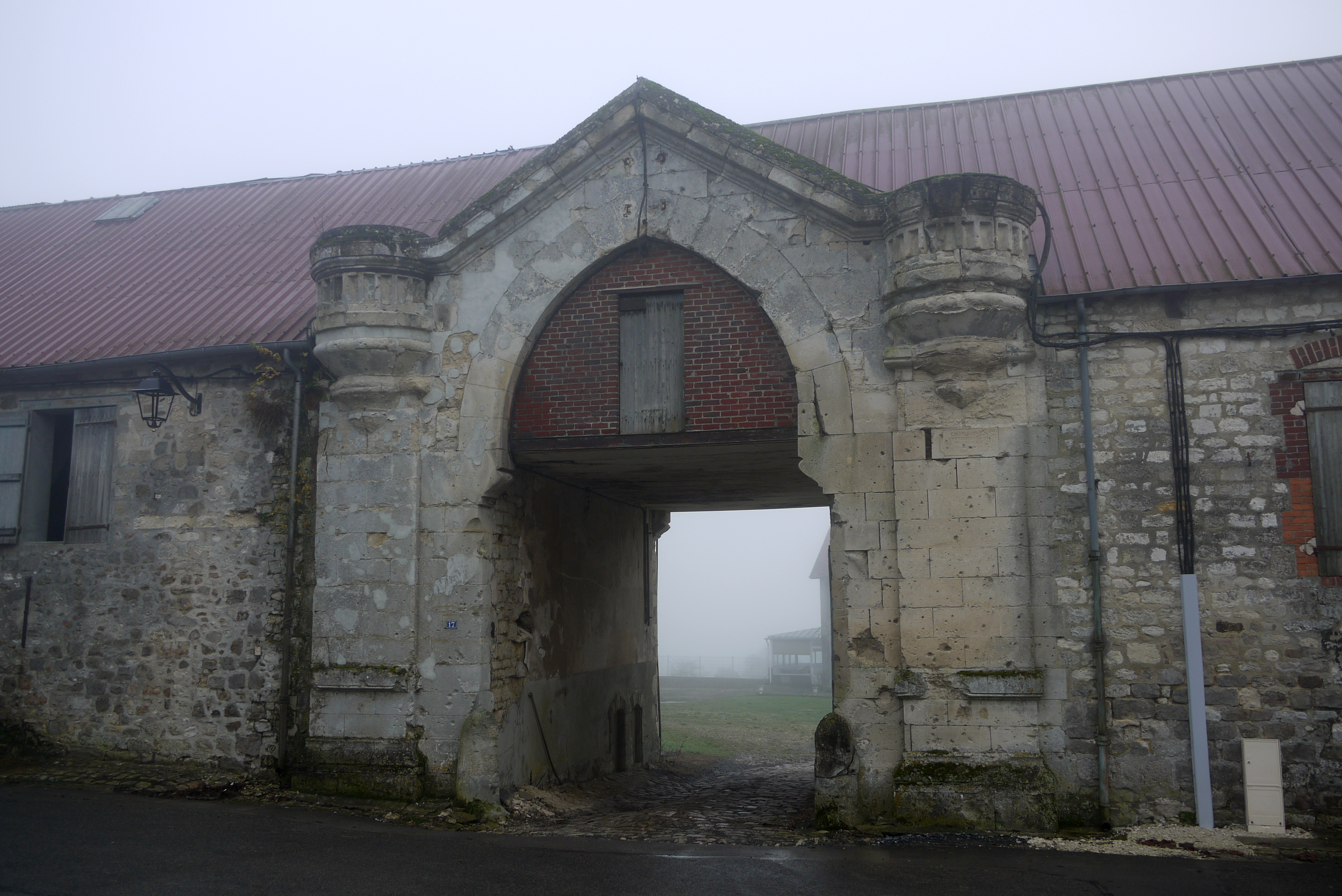
- Farm entrance in Noroy-sur-Ourcq
- Location of Noroy-sur-Ourcq
- Location within France Location within Hauts-de-France
- Coordinates: 49°12′22″N 3°12′53″E
- Country: France
- Region: Hauts-de-France
- Department: Aisne
- Arrondissement: Soissons
- Canton: Villers-Cotterêts

Government
  - Mayor (2026–32): Dragomir Kiprijanovski
- Area^{1}: 5.15 km^{2} (1.99 sq mi)
- Elevation: 135 m (443 ft)
- Highest elevation: 172 m (564 ft)
- Lowest elevation: 67 m (220 ft)
- Population (2023): 124
  - Density: 24.1/km^{2} (62.4/sq mi)
- Time zone: UTC+01:00 (CET)
  - Summer (DST): UTC+02:00 (CEST)
- INSEE/Postal code: 02557 /02600
- ^{1} French Land Register data, which excludes lakes, ponds, glaciers > 1 km^{2} (0.386 sq mi or 247 acres) and river estuaries.

Noroy-sur-Ourcq (French pronunciation: [nɔʁwa syʁ uʁk], literally Noroy on Ourcq) is a commune in the Aisne department in Hauts-de-France in northern France.

== Population ==
Historical population
Year	Pop.	±% p.a.
1968	84	—
1975	62	−4.25%
1982	76	+2.95%
1990	91	+2.28%
1999	122	+3.31%
2007	151	+2.70%
2012	146	−0.67%
2017	130	−2.29%
2023	124	−0.78%
Source: INSEE

== See also ==
- Communes of the Aisne department
