= Chacrise =

- Commune
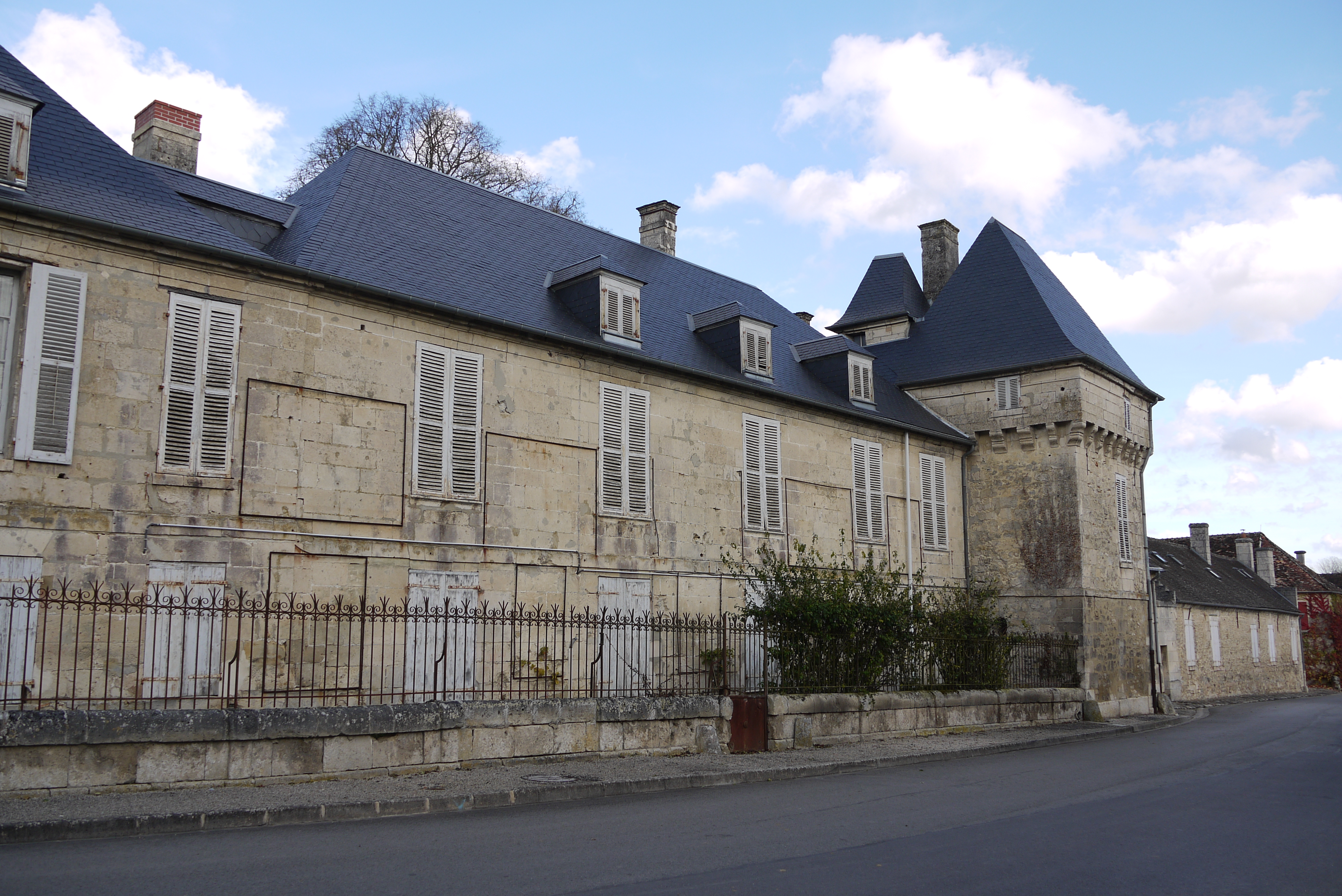
- The old chateau of Villeblain
- Location of Chacrise
- Location within France Location within Hauts-de-France
- Coordinates: 49°18′23″N 3°24′14″E
- Country: France
- Region: Hauts-de-France
- Department: Aisne
- Arrondissement: Soissons
- Canton: Villers-Cotterêts
- Intercommunality: Oulchy-le-Château

Government
  - Mayor (2026–32): Sébastien Petit
- Area^{1}: 12.74 km^{2} (4.92 sq mi)
- Elevation: 85 m (279 ft)
- Highest elevation: 173 m (568 ft)
- Lowest elevation: 65 m (213 ft)
- Population (2023): 375
  - Density: 29.4/km^{2} (76.2/sq mi)
- Time zone: UTC+01:00 (CET)
  - Summer (DST): UTC+02:00 (CEST)
- INSEE/Postal code: 02154 /02200
- ^{1} French Land Register data, which excludes lakes, ponds, glaciers > 1 km^{2} (0.386 sq mi or 247 acres) and river estuaries.

Chacrise (French pronunciation: [ʃakʁiz]) is a commune in the Aisne department in Hauts-de-France in northern France.

== Population ==
Historical population
| Year | Pop. | ±% p.a. |
|---|---|---|
| 1968 | 288 | — |
| 1975 | 240 | −2.57% |
| 1982 | 296 | +3.04% |
| 1990 | 320 | +0.98% |
| 1999 | 339 | +0.64% |
| 2007 | 310 | −1.11% |
| 2012 | 326 | +1.01% |
| 2017 | 361 | +2.06% |
| 2023 | 375 | +0.64% |
Source: INSEE

== See also ==
- Communes of the Aisne department
