= Louâtre =

- Commune
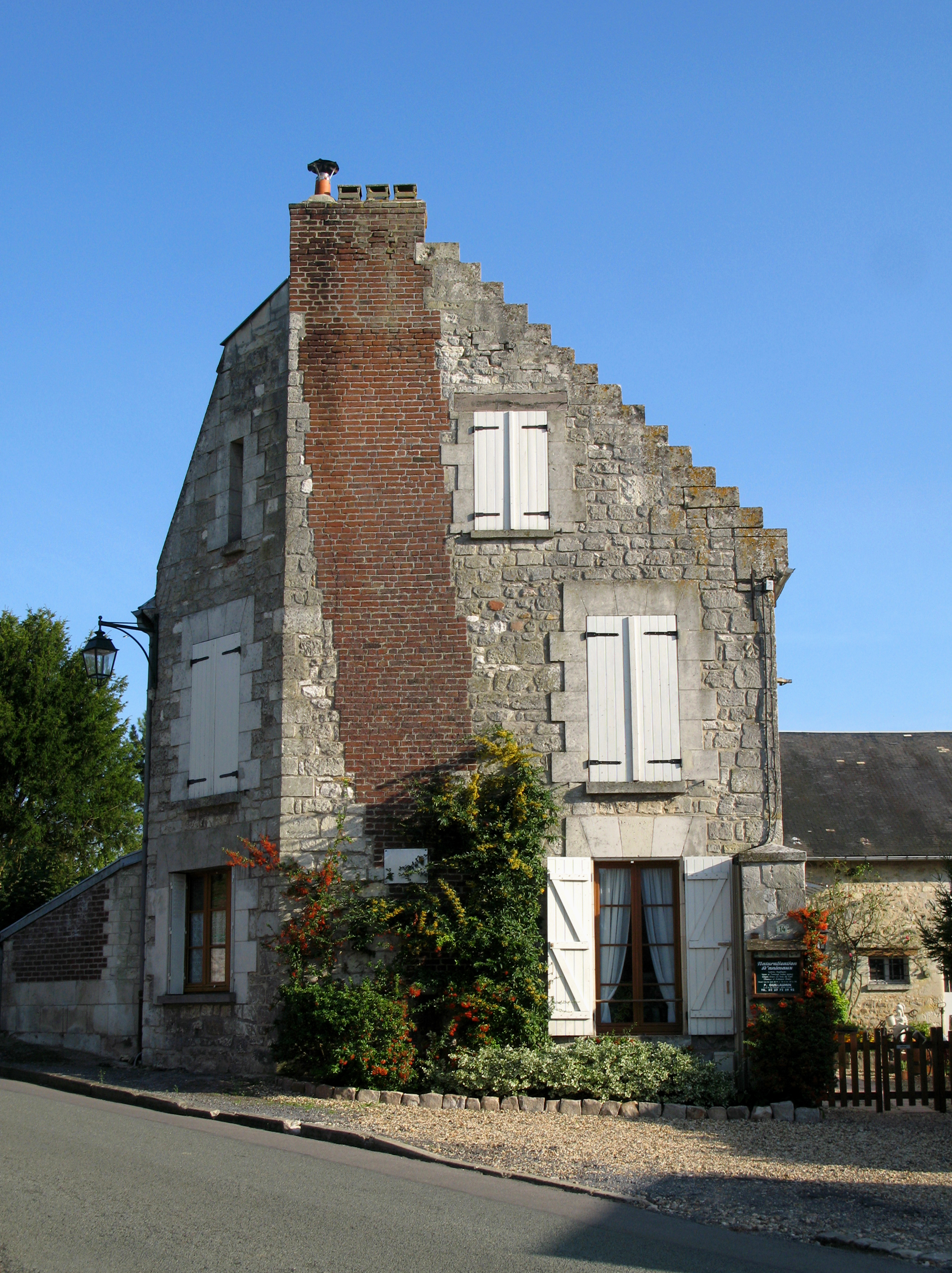
- A house in Louâtre
- Location of Louâtre
- Location within France Location within Hauts-de-France
- Coordinates: 49°15′28″N 3°14′48″E
- Country: France
- Region: Hauts-de-France
- Department: Aisne
- Arrondissement: Soissons
- Canton: Villers-Cotterêts

Government
  - Mayor (2026–32): Christelle Jullien
- Area^{1}: 11.02 km^{2} (4.25 sq mi)
- Elevation: 160 m (520 ft)
- Highest elevation: 186 m (610 ft)
- Lowest elevation: 77 m (253 ft)
- Population (2023): 203
  - Density: 18.4/km^{2} (47.7/sq mi)
- Time zone: UTC+01:00 (CET)
  - Summer (DST): UTC+02:00 (CEST)
- INSEE/Postal code: 02441 /02600
- ^{1} French Land Register data, which excludes lakes, ponds, glaciers > 1 km^{2} (0.386 sq mi or 247 acres) and river estuaries.

Louâtre (French pronunciation: [lwatʁ]) is a commune in the Aisne department in Hauts-de-France in northern France.

== History ==
=== Historical development ===
The name of Louâtre has appeared in several historical forms, including Lostria, Loistria, Loistris, Loystres, Loistres, Louastre, Loatre and Loastre. These variations are recorded in the historical place-name dictionary of the Aisne department.

The settlement developed across a landscape of hills and valleys. Its principal inhabited areas included Louâtre and the hamlet of Violaine, situated on higher ground, while other smaller settlements developed near the local streams, particularly the Savière and Nadon.

=== Architectural heritage ===
The church of Saint-Rémy contains architectural elements dating from the 12th and 16th centuries and is listed as a Monument historique. Its choir dates from 1551 and contains a large stained-glass window.

Other historical buildings include the former seigneurial residence associated with Jean d'Estrées, Grand Master of the Royal Artillery, and the manor known as the Manoir du Désert. The former farm known as La Recette was also built around 1550 by Jean d'Estrées.

=== First World War ===
In 1918, the village suffered serious damage during the fighting in the region. Despite the destruction, the church of Saint-Rémy survived and was subsequently preserved through maintenance and restoration work undertaken by the commune.

== Population ==
Historical population
Year	Pop.	±% p.a.
1968	197	—
1975	169	−2.17%
1982	191	+1.76%
1990	203	+0.76%
1999	216	+0.69%
2007	212	−0.23%
2012	208	−0.38%
2017	199	−0.88%
2023	203	+0.33%
Source: INSEE

== See also ==
- Communes of the Aisne department
