= Cramaille =

- Commune
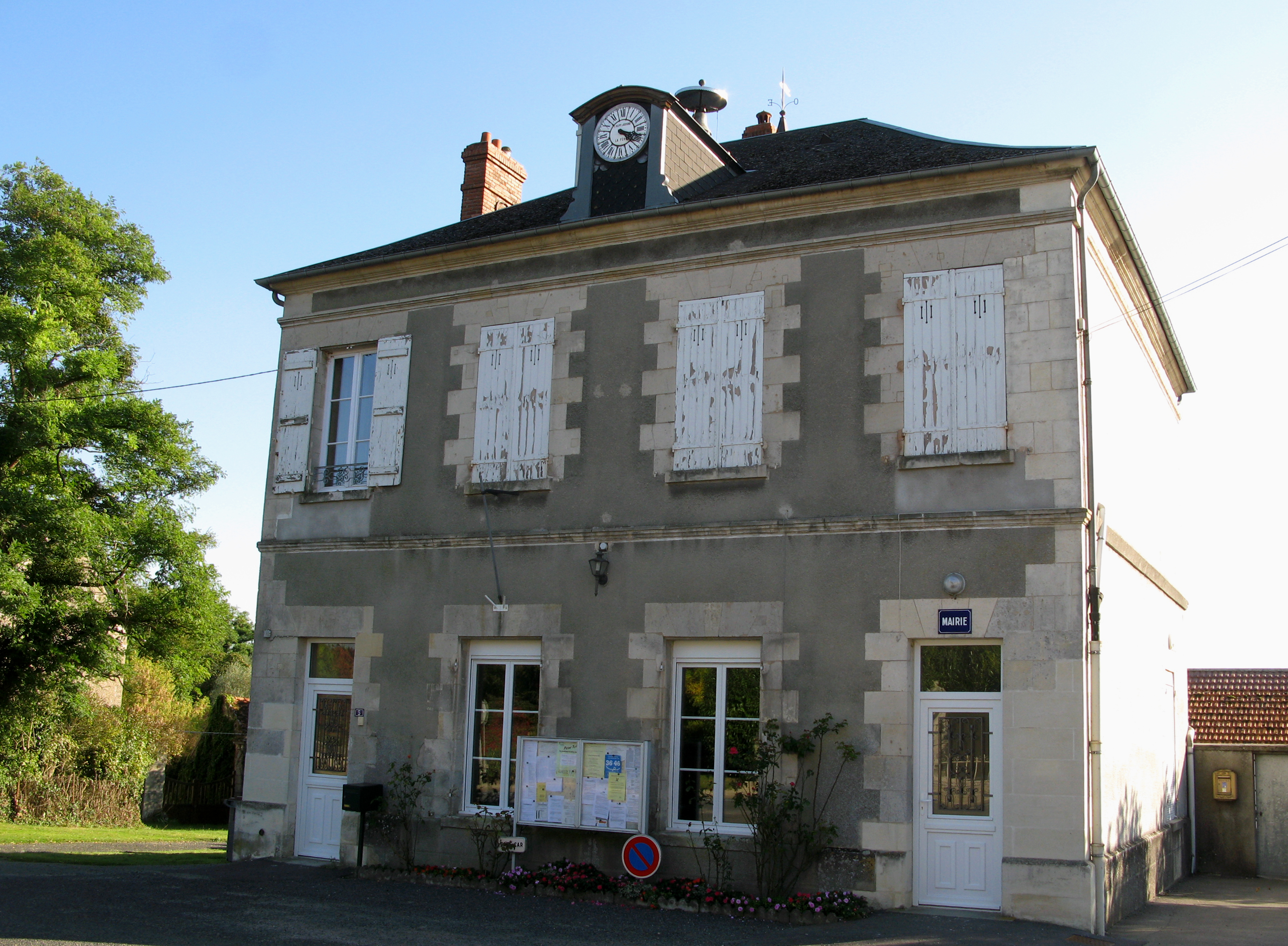
- Town hall
- Location of Cramaille
- Location within France Location within Hauts-de-France
- Coordinates: 49°13′49″N 3°27′19″E
- Country: France
- Region: Hauts-de-France
- Department: Aisne
- Arrondissement: Soissons
- Canton: Villers-Cotterêts
- Intercommunality: Oulchy le Château

Government
  - Mayor (2026–32): Didier Grenot
- Area^{1}: 8.12 km^{2} (3.14 sq mi)
- Elevation: 153 m (502 ft)
- Highest elevation: 197 m (646 ft)
- Lowest elevation: 123 m (404 ft)
- Population (2023): 127
  - Density: 15.6/km^{2} (40.5/sq mi)
- Time zone: UTC+01:00 (CET)
  - Summer (DST): UTC+02:00 (CEST)
- INSEE/Postal code: 02233 /02130
- ^{1} French Land Register data, which excludes lakes, ponds, glaciers > 1 km^{2} (0.386 sq mi or 247 acres) and river estuaries.

Cramaille (French pronunciation: [kʁamaj]) is a commune in the Aisne department in Hauts-de-France in northern France.

== Population ==
Historical population
Year	Pop.	±% p.a.
1968	172	—
1975	135	−3.40%
1982	127	−0.87%
1990	108	−2.01%
1999	102	−0.63%
2007	120	+2.05%
2012	131	+1.77%
2017	143	+1.77%
2023	127	−1.96%
Source: INSEE

== See also ==
- Communes of the Aisne department
