= Taillefontaine =

- Commune
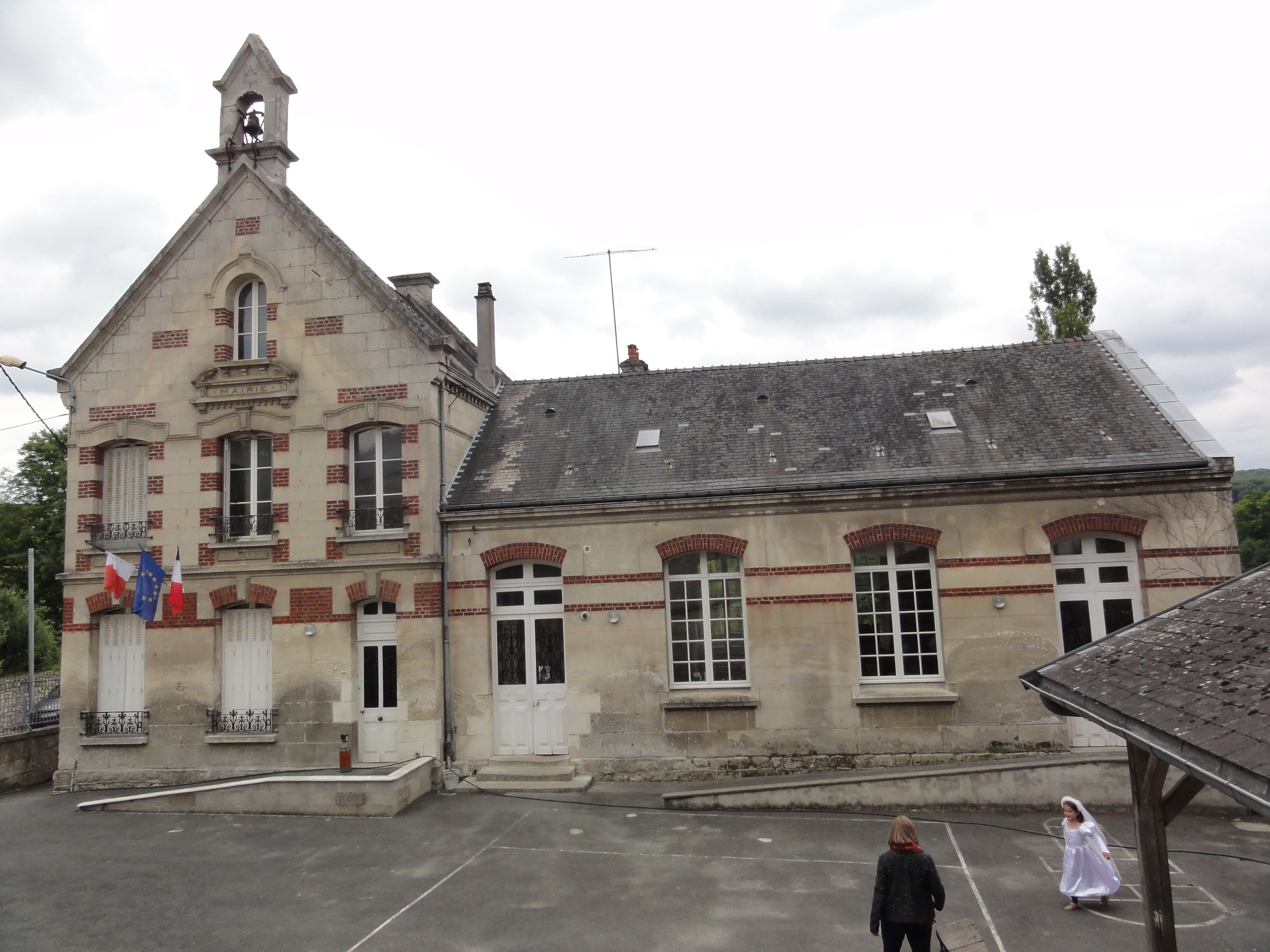
- The town hall and school of Taillefontaine
- Location of Taillefontaine
- Location within France Location within Hauts-de-France
- Coordinates: 49°18′43″N 3°02′36″E
- Country: France
- Region: Hauts-de-France
- Department: Aisne
- Arrondissement: Soissons
- Canton: Villers-Cotterêts
- Intercommunality: Retz-en-Valois

Government
  - Mayor (2026–32): Eric Parillaud
- Area^{1}: 10.63 km^{2} (4.10 sq mi)
- Elevation: 103 m (338 ft)
- Highest elevation: 238 m (781 ft)
- Lowest elevation: 65 m (213 ft)
- Population (2023): 257
  - Density: 24.2/km^{2} (62.6/sq mi)
- Time zone: UTC+01:00 (CET)
  - Summer (DST): UTC+02:00 (CEST)
- INSEE/Postal code: 02734 /02600
- ^{1} French Land Register data, which excludes lakes, ponds, glaciers > 1 km^{2} (0.386 sq mi or 247 acres) and river estuaries.

Taillefontaine (French pronunciation: [tajfɔ̃tɛn]) is a commune in the Aisne department in Hauts-de-France in northern France.

== Population ==
Historical population
Year	Pop.	±% p.a.
1968	320	—
1975	281	−1.84%
1982	255	−1.38%
1990	270	+0.72%
1999	287	+0.68%
2007	274	−0.58%
2012	262	−0.89%
2017	276	+1.05%
2023	257	−1.18%
Source: INSEE

== See also ==
- Communes of the Aisne department
