= Bonnesvalyn =

- Commune
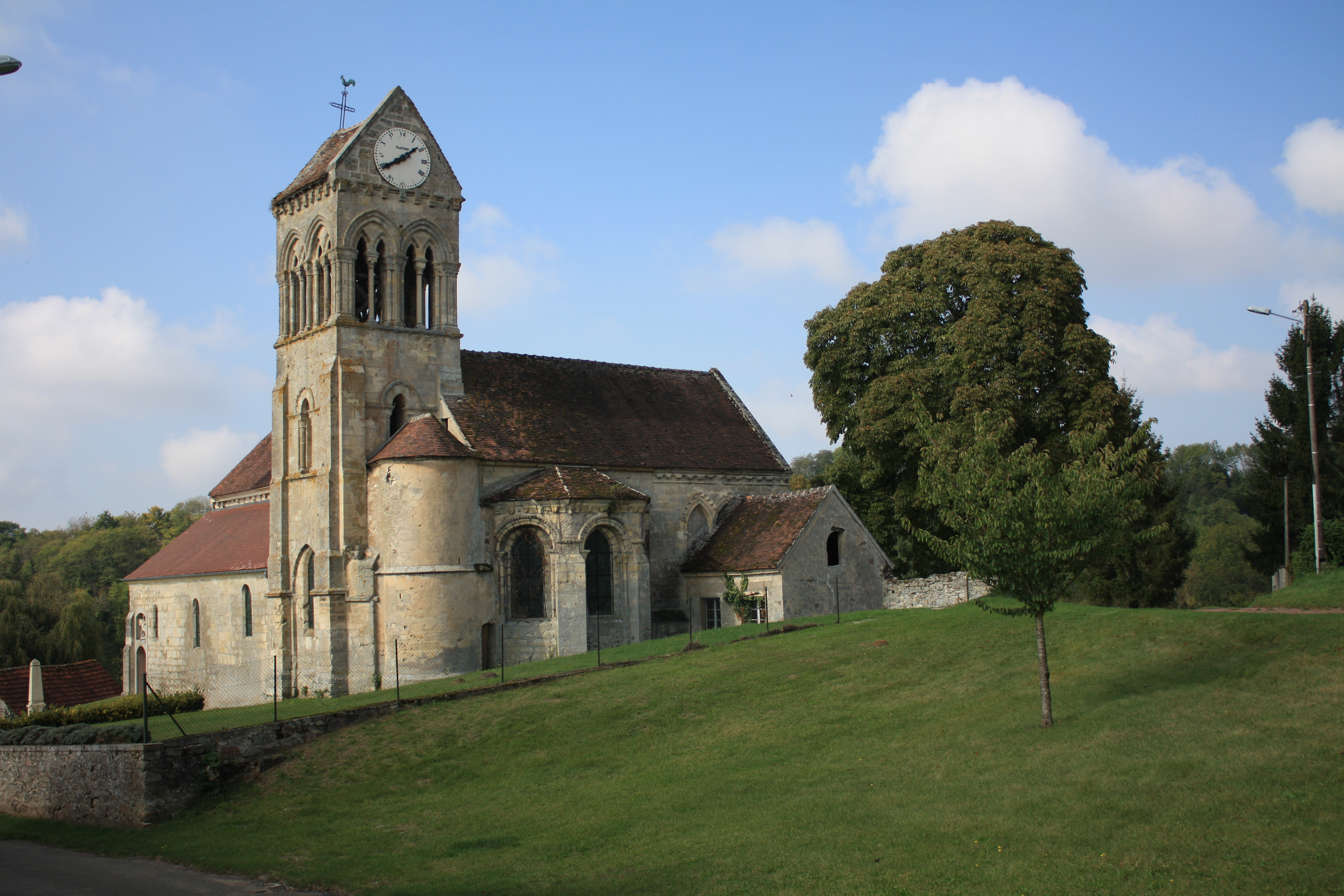
- The church of Bonnesvalyn
- Location of Bonnesvalyn
- Location within France Location within Hauts-de-France
- Coordinates: 49°07′22″N 3°19′03″E
- Country: France
- Region: Hauts-de-France
- Department: Aisne
- Arrondissement: Château-Thierry
- Canton: Villers-Cotterêts
- Intercommunality: CA Région de Château-Thierry

Government
  - Mayor (2026–32): Stéphane Frère
- Area^{1}: 6.34 km^{2} (2.45 sq mi)
- Elevation: 115 m (377 ft)
- Highest elevation: 210 m (690 ft)
- Lowest elevation: 100 m (330 ft)
- Population (2023): 212
  - Density: 33.4/km^{2} (86.6/sq mi)
- Time zone: UTC+01:00 (CET)
  - Summer (DST): UTC+02:00 (CEST)
- INSEE/Postal code: 02099 /02400
- ^{1} French Land Register data, which excludes lakes, ponds, glaciers > 1 km^{2} (0.386 sq mi or 247 acres) and river estuaries.

Bonnesvalyn is a commune in the department of Aisne in Hauts-de-France in northern France.

== Population ==
Historical population
Year	Pop.	±% p.a.
1968	148	—
1975	142	−0.59%
1982	139	−0.30%
1990	203	+4.85%
1999	199	−0.22%
2007	209	+0.61%
2012	245	+3.23%
2017	236	−0.75%
2023	212	−1.77%
Source: INSEE

== See also ==
- Communes of the Aisne department
