= Puiseux-en-Retz =

- Commune
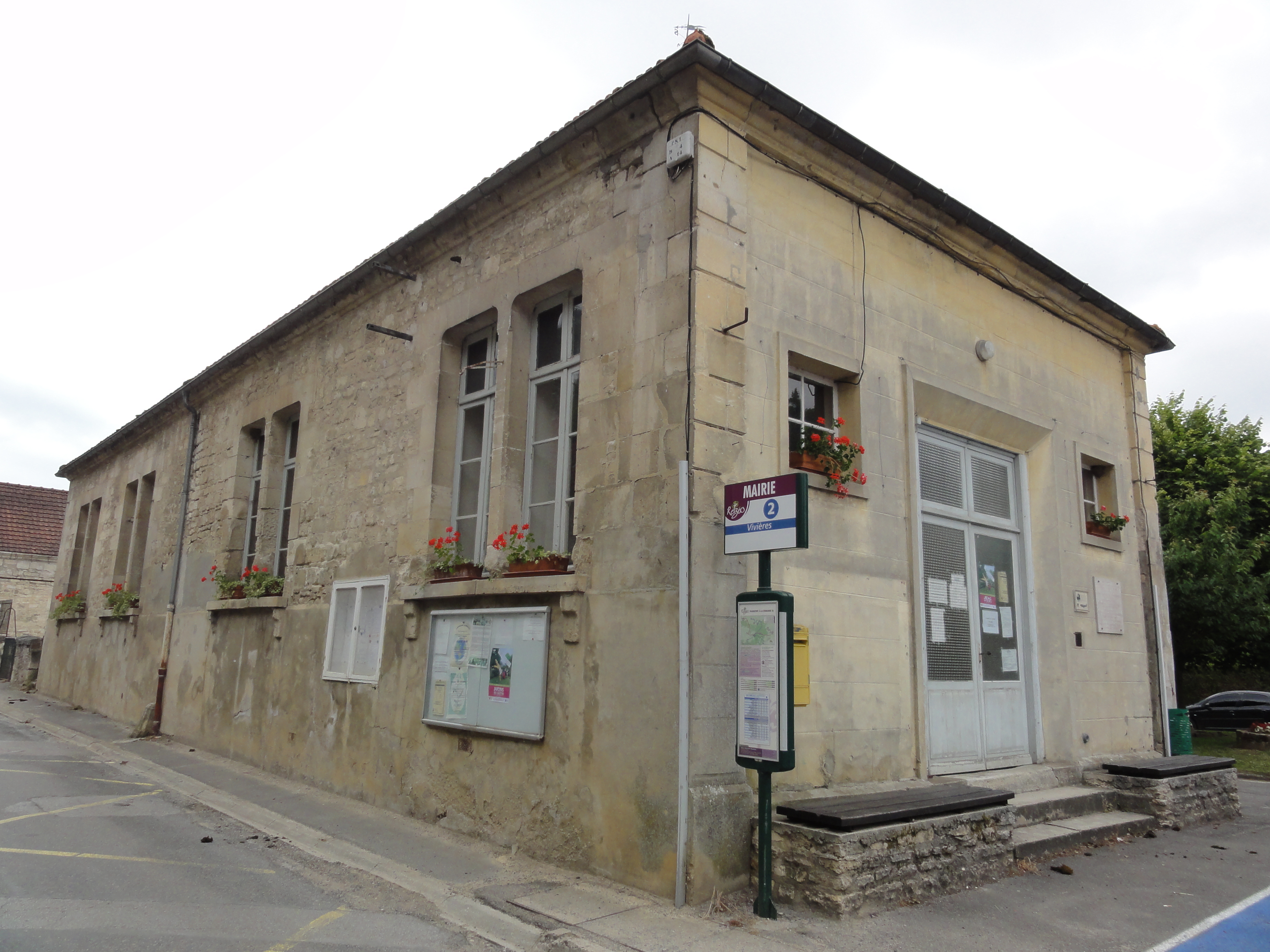
- The town hall of Puiseux-en-Retz
- Location of Puiseux-en-Retz
- Location within France Location within Hauts-de-France
- Coordinates: 49°17′55″N 3°07′47″E
- Country: France
- Region: Hauts-de-France
- Department: Aisne
- Arrondissement: Soissons
- Canton: Villers-Cotterêts

Government
  - Mayor (2026–32): Thierry Gilles
- Area^{1}: 9.88 km^{2} (3.81 sq mi)
- Elevation: 95 m (312 ft)
- Highest elevation: 226 m (741 ft)
- Lowest elevation: 78 m (256 ft)
- Population (2023): 219
  - Density: 22.2/km^{2} (57.4/sq mi)
- Time zone: UTC+01:00 (CET)
  - Summer (DST): UTC+02:00 (CEST)
- INSEE/Postal code: 02628 /02600
- ^{1} French Land Register data, which excludes lakes, ponds, glaciers > 1 km^{2} (0.386 sq mi or 247 acres) and river estuaries.

Puiseux-en-Retz is a commune in the Aisne department in Hauts-de-France in northern France.

== Population ==
Historical population
Year	Pop.	±% p.a.
1968	141	—
1975	120	−2.28%
1982	143	+2.54%
1990	229	+6.06%
1999	234	+0.24%
2007	229	−0.27%
2012	218	−0.98%
2017	214	−0.37%
2023	219	+0.39%
Source: INSEE

== See also ==
- Communes of the Aisne department
