= Fleury, Aisne =

Fleury
- Commune
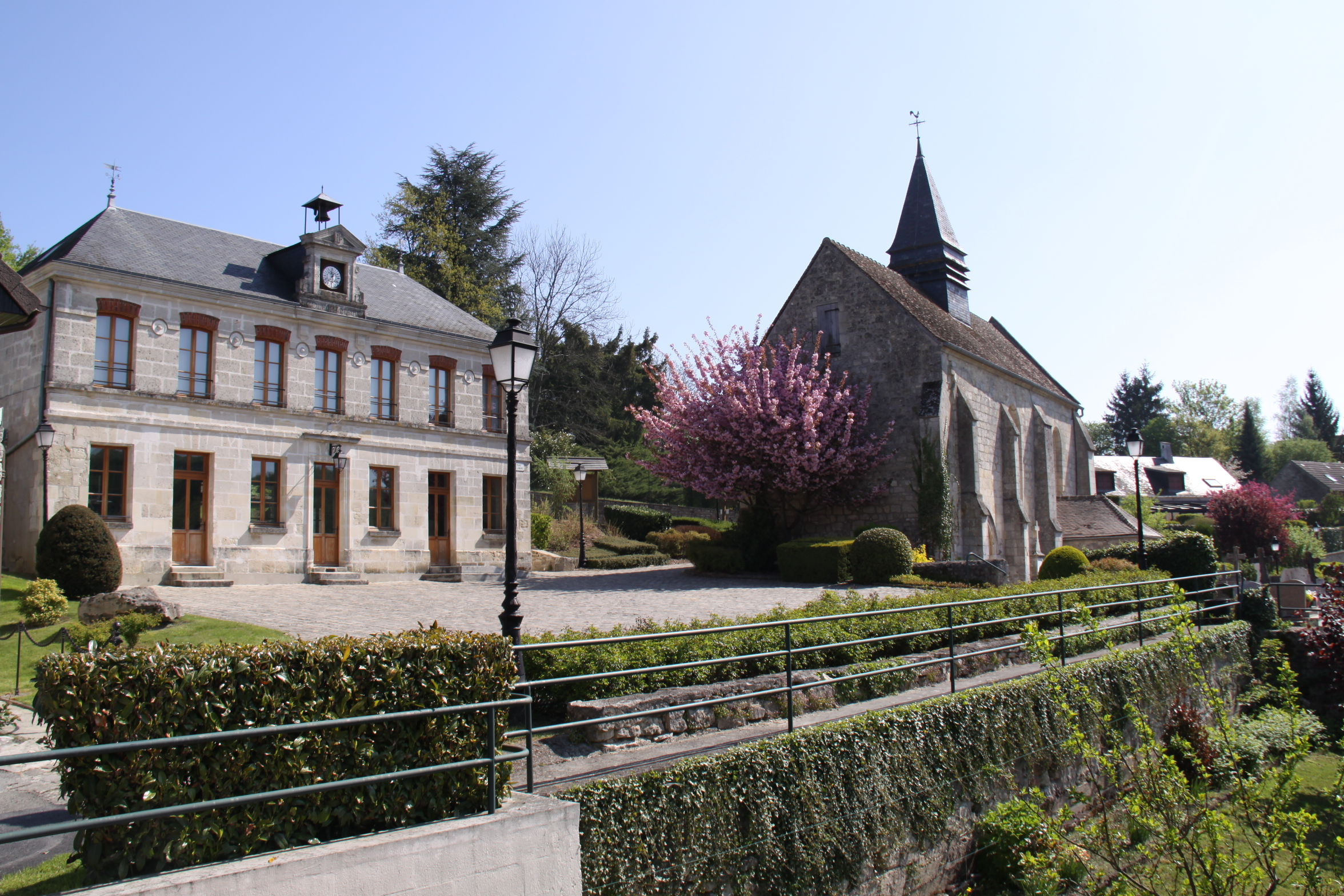
- The town hall and church of Fleury
- Location of Fleury
- Location within France Location within Hauts-de-France
- Coordinates: 49°15′32″N 3°09′24″E
- Country: France
- Region: Hauts-de-France
- Department: Aisne
- Arrondissement: Soissons
- Canton: Villers-Cotterêts

Government
  - Mayor (2026–32): Jean-François Danger
- Area^{1}: 6.51 km^{2} (2.51 sq mi)
- Elevation: 98 m (322 ft)
- Highest elevation: 191 m (627 ft)
- Lowest elevation: 91 m (299 ft)
- Population (2023): 130
  - Density: 20/km^{2} (52/sq mi)
- Time zone: UTC+01:00 (CET)
  - Summer (DST): UTC+02:00 (CEST)
- INSEE/Postal code: 02316 /02600
- ^{1} French Land Register data, which excludes lakes, ponds, glaciers > 1 km^{2} (0.386 sq mi or 247 acres) and river estuaries.

Fleury (French pronunciation: [flœʁi]) is a commune in the Aisne department in Hauts-de-France in northern France.

== Population ==
Historical population
Year	Pop.	±% p.a.
1968	85	—
1975	99	+2.20%
1982	138	+4.86%
1990	128	−0.94%
1999	148	+1.63%
2007	139	−0.78%
2012	130	−1.33%
2017	136	+0.91%
2023	130	−0.75%
Source: INSEE

== See also ==
- Communes of the Aisne department
