= Dampleux =

- Commune
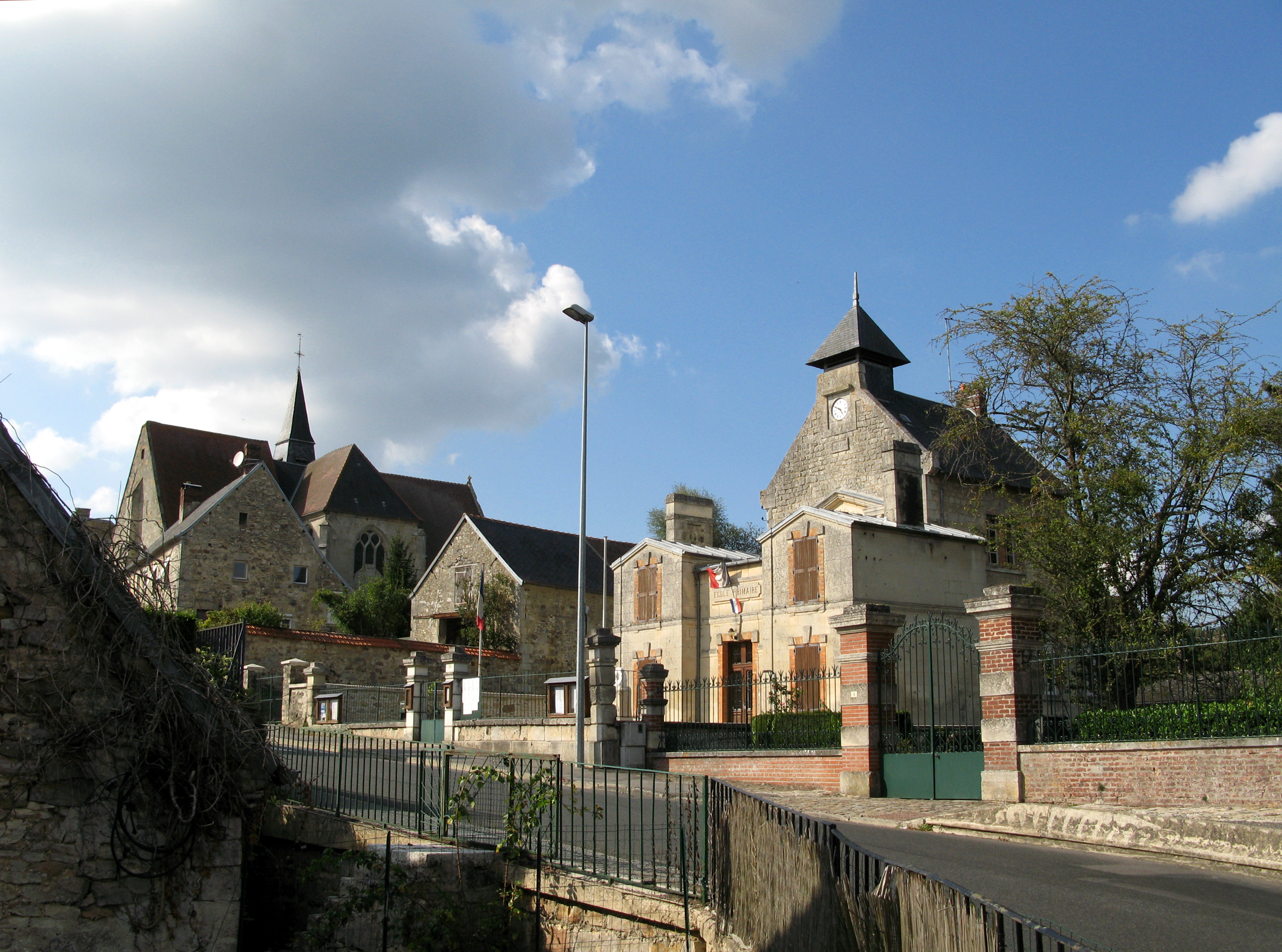
- The town hall and church of Dampleux
- Location of Dampleux
- Location within France Location within Hauts-de-France
- Coordinates: 49°14′38″N 3°09′18″E
- Country: France
- Region: Hauts-de-France
- Department: Aisne
- Arrondissement: Soissons
- Canton: Villers-Cotterêts

Government
  - Mayor (2026–32): Guillaume Seguin
- Area^{1}: 8.19 km^{2} (3.16 sq mi)
- Elevation: 155 m (509 ft)
- Highest elevation: 187 m (614 ft)
- Lowest elevation: 92 m (302 ft)
- Population (2023): 370
  - Density: 45/km^{2} (120/sq mi)
- Time zone: UTC+01:00 (CET)
  - Summer (DST): UTC+02:00 (CEST)
- INSEE/Postal code: 02259 /02600
- ^{1} French Land Register data, which excludes lakes, ponds, glaciers > 1 km^{2} (0.386 sq mi or 247 acres) and river estuaries.

Dampleux (French pronunciation: [dɑ̃plø]) is a commune in the Aisne department and Hauts-de-France region of northern France.

== Population ==
Historical population
Year	Pop.	±% p.a.
1968	149	—
1975	152	+0.29%
1982	265	+8.26%
1990	345	+3.35%
1999	380	+1.08%
2007	425	+1.41%
2012	417	−0.38%
2017	398	−0.93%
2023	370	−1.21%
Source: INSEE

== See also ==
- Communes of the Aisne department
