= Le Plessier-Huleu =

- Commune
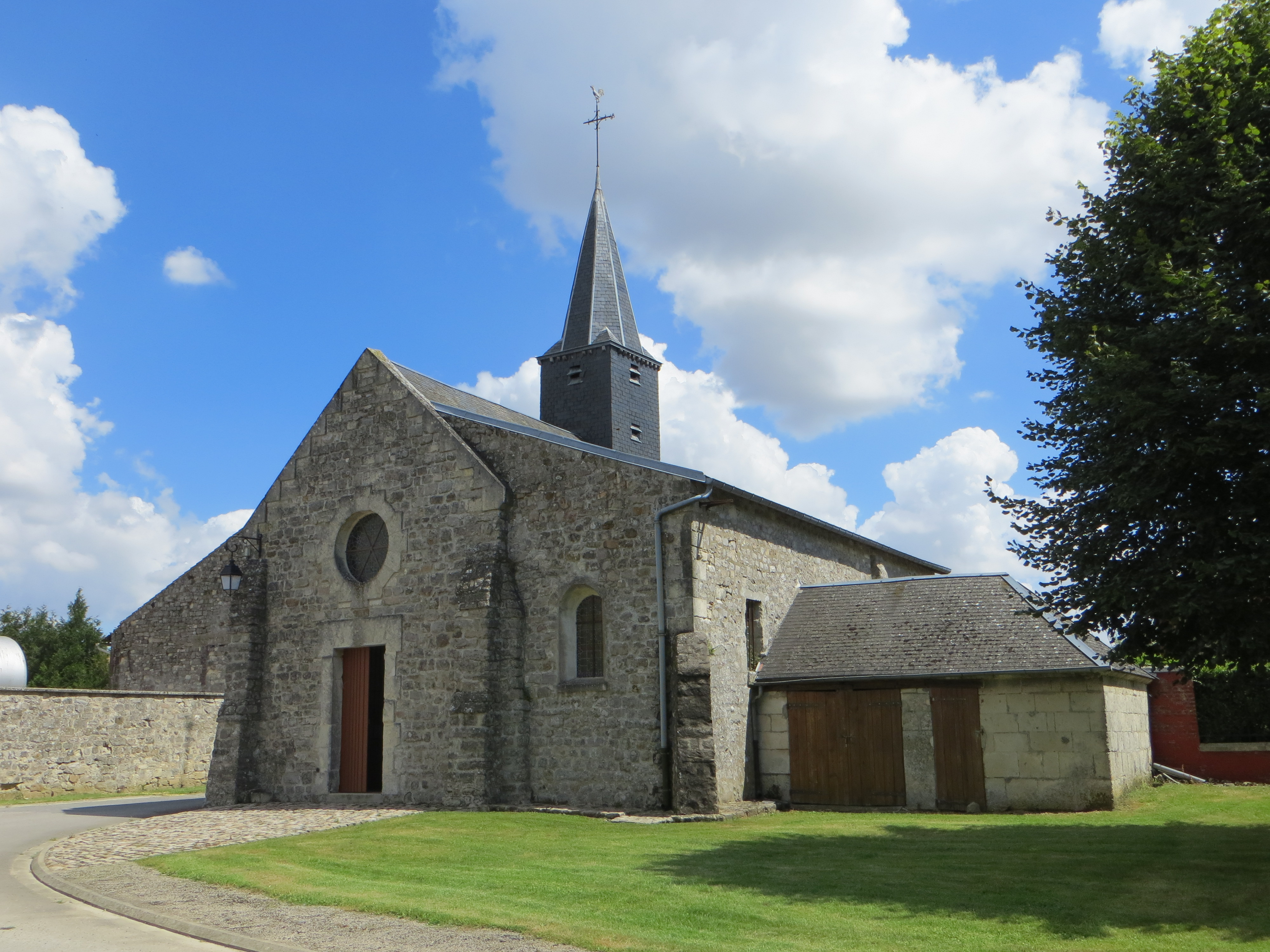
- The church of Le Plessier-Huleu
- Location of Le Plessier-Huleu
- Location within France Location within Hauts-de-France
- Coordinates: 49°14′22″N 3°20′44″E
- Country: France
- Region: Hauts-de-France
- Department: Aisne
- Arrondissement: Soissons
- Canton: Villers-Cotterêts
- Intercommunality: Oulchy le Château

Government
  - Mayor (2026–32): Jean-Michel Boudeele<
- Area^{1}: 5.2 km^{2} (2.0 sq mi)
- Elevation: 180 m (590 ft)
- Highest elevation: 203 m (666 ft)
- Lowest elevation: 132 m (433 ft)
- Population (2023): 93
  - Density: 18/km^{2} (46/sq mi)
- Time zone: UTC+01:00 (CET)
  - Summer (DST): UTC+02:00 (CEST)
- INSEE/Postal code: 02606 /02210
- ^{1} French Land Register data, which excludes lakes, ponds, glaciers > 1 km^{2} (0.386 sq mi or 247 acres) and river estuaries.

Le Plessier-Huleu (French pronunciation: [lə plɛsje ylø]) is a commune in the Aisne department in Hauts-de-France in northern France.

== Population ==
Historical population
Year	Pop.	±% p.a.
1968	88	—
1975	71	−3.02%
1982	47	−5.72%
1990	44	−0.82%
1999	77	+6.42%
2007	79	+0.32%
2012	74	−1.30%
2017	71	−0.82%
2023	93	+4.60%
Source: INSEE

== See also ==
- Communes of the Aisne department
