= Soucy, Aisne =

Soucy
- Commune
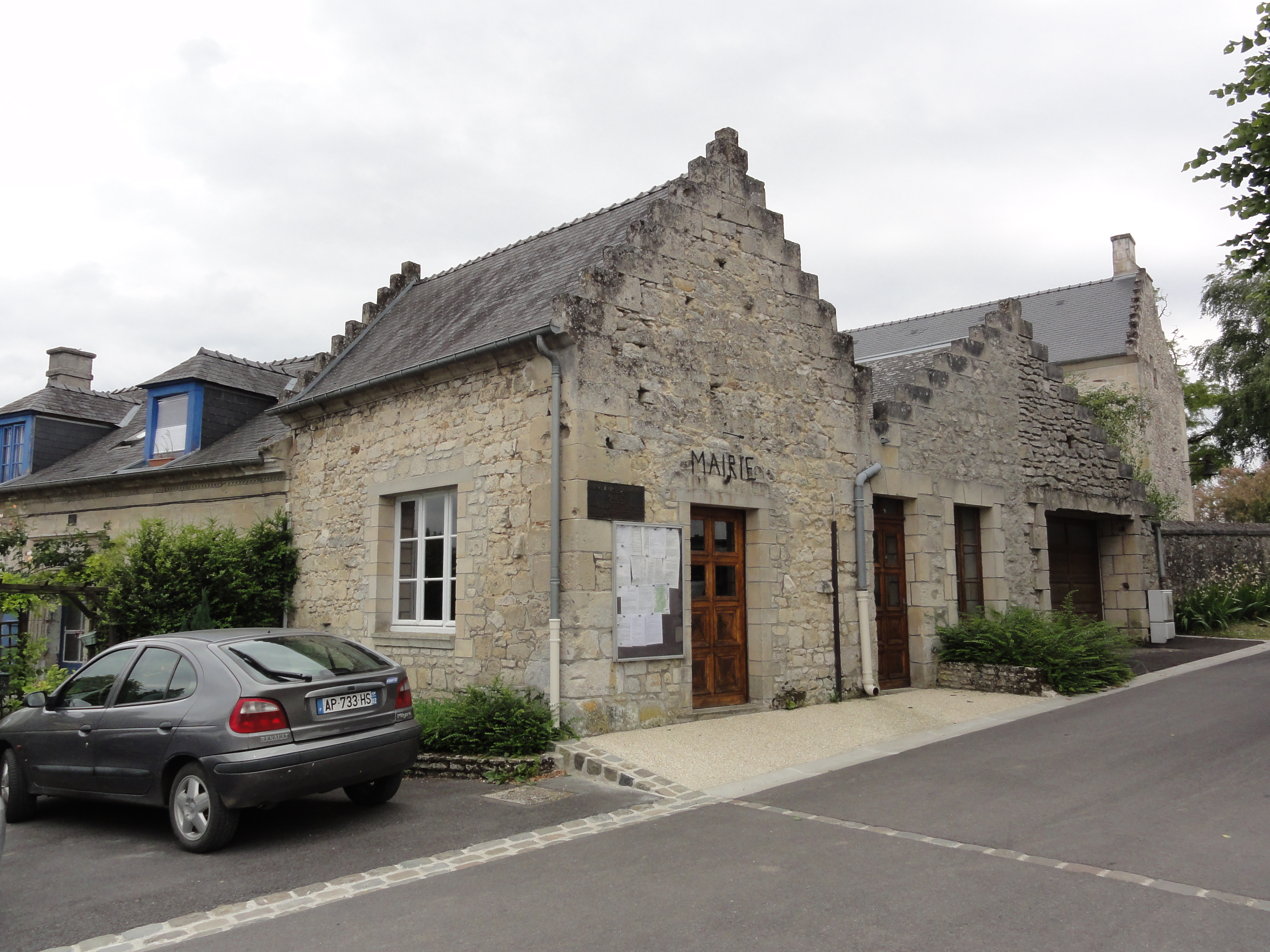
- The town hall of Soucy
- Location of Soucy
- Location within France Location within Hauts-de-France
- Coordinates: 49°18′49″N 3°07′36″E
- Country: France
- Region: Hauts-de-France
- Department: Aisne
- Arrondissement: Soissons
- Canton: Villers-Cotterêts

Government
  - Mayor (2026–32): Daniel Gobbe
- Area^{1}: 5.22 km^{2} (2.02 sq mi)
- Elevation: 152 m (499 ft)
- Highest elevation: 152 m (499 ft)
- Lowest elevation: 65 m (213 ft)
- Population (2023): 74
  - Density: 14/km^{2} (37/sq mi)
- Time zone: UTC+01:00 (CET)
  - Summer (DST): UTC+02:00 (CEST)
- INSEE/Postal code: 02729 /02600
- ^{1} French Land Register data, which excludes lakes, ponds, glaciers > 1 km^{2} (0.386 sq mi or 247 acres) and river estuaries.

Soucy (French pronunciation: [susi]) is a commune in the Aisne department in Hauts-de-France in northern France.

== Population ==
Historical population
Year	Pop.	±% p.a.
1968	89	—
1975	72	−2.98%
1982	62	−2.11%
1990	68	+1.16%
1999	73	+0.79%
2007	75	+0.34%
2012	93	+4.40%
2017	97	+0.85%
2023	74	−4.41%
Source: INSEE

== See also ==
- Communes of the Aisne department
