= Coyolles =

- Commune
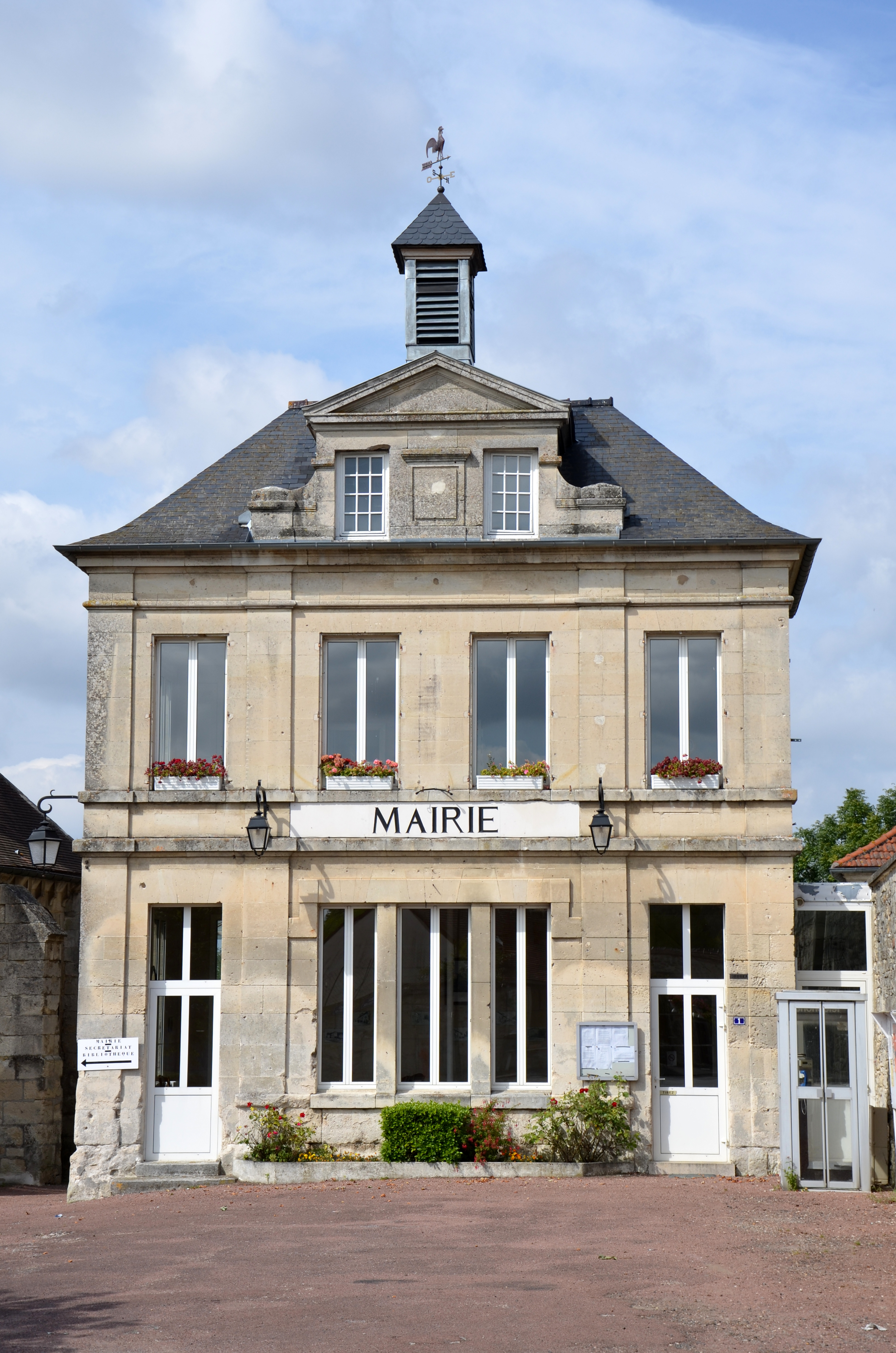
- Town hall
- Location of Coyolles
- Location within France Location within Hauts-de-France
- Coordinates: 49°14′06″N 3°02′40″E
- Country: France
- Region: Hauts-de-France
- Department: Aisne
- Arrondissement: Soissons
- Canton: Villers-Cotterêts

Government
  - Mayor (2026–32): Robert Nelaton
- Area^{1}: 24.55 km^{2} (9.48 sq mi)
- Elevation: 109 m (358 ft)
- Highest elevation: 170 m (560 ft)
- Lowest elevation: 72 m (236 ft)
- Population (2023): 366
  - Density: 14.9/km^{2} (38.6/sq mi)
- Time zone: UTC+01:00 (CET)
  - Summer (DST): UTC+02:00 (CEST)
- INSEE/Postal code: 02232 /02600
- ^{1} French Land Register data, which excludes lakes, ponds, glaciers > 1 km^{2} (0.386 sq mi or 247 acres) and river estuaries.

Coyolles is a commune in the Aisne department in Hauts-de-France in northern France. It lies 4 km southwest of Villers-Cotterêts.

== Population ==
Historical population
Year	Pop.	±% p.a.
1968	212	—
1975	212	+0.00%
1982	323	+6.20%
1990	370	+1.71%
1999	359	−0.33%
2007	349	−0.35%
2012	389	+2.19%
2017	344	−2.43%
2023	366	+1.04%
Source: INSEE

== See also ==
- Communes of the Aisne department
