= Montgru-Saint-Hilaire =

- Commune
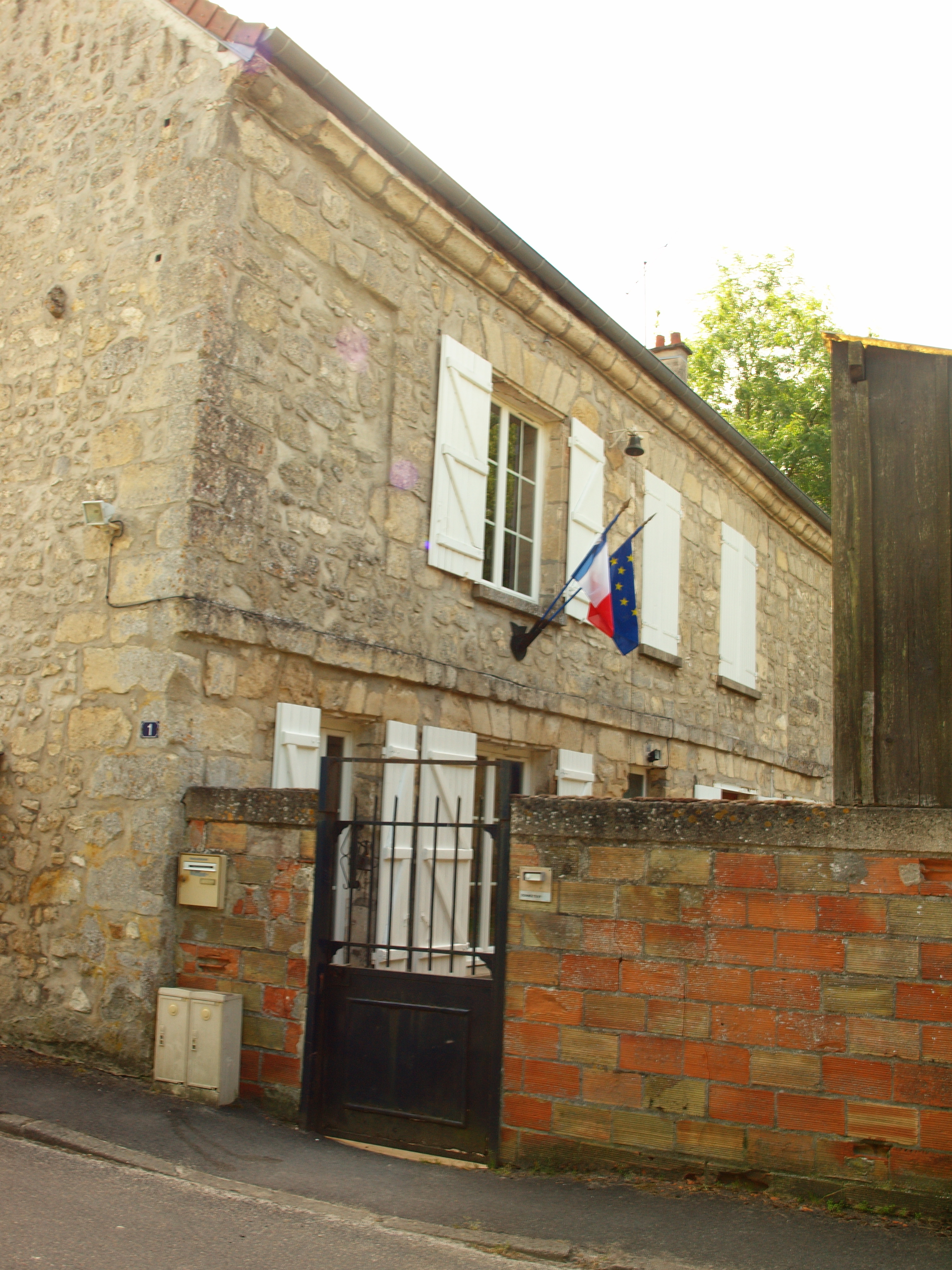
- The town hall of Montgru-Saint-Hilaire
- Location of Montgru-Saint-Hilaire
- Location within France Location within Hauts-de-France
- Coordinates: 49°11′25″N 3°19′47″E
- Country: France
- Region: Hauts-de-France
- Department: Aisne
- Arrondissement: Soissons
- Canton: Villers-Cotterêts
- Intercommunality: Oulchy le Château

Government
  - Mayor (2026–32): Béatrice Leveque
- Area^{1}: 3.24 km^{2} (1.25 sq mi)
- Elevation: 100 m (330 ft)
- Highest elevation: 181 m (594 ft)
- Lowest elevation: 78 m (256 ft)
- Population (2023): 30
  - Density: 9.3/km^{2} (24/sq mi)
- Time zone: UTC+01:00 (CET)
  - Summer (DST): UTC+02:00 (CEST)
- INSEE/Postal code: 02507 /02210
- ^{1} French Land Register data, which excludes lakes, ponds, glaciers > 1 km^{2} (0.386 sq mi or 247 acres) and river estuaries.

Montgru-Saint-Hilaire is a commune in the Aisne department in Hauts-de-France in northern France.

== Population ==
Historical population
Year	Pop.	±% p.a.
1968	42	—
1975	25	−7.14%
1982	25	+0.00%
1990	37	+5.02%
1999	40	+0.87%
2007	34	−2.01%
2012	35	+0.58%
2017	32	−1.78%
2023	30	−1.07%
Source: INSEE

== See also ==
- Communes of the Aisne department
