= Rozières-sur-Crise =

- Commune
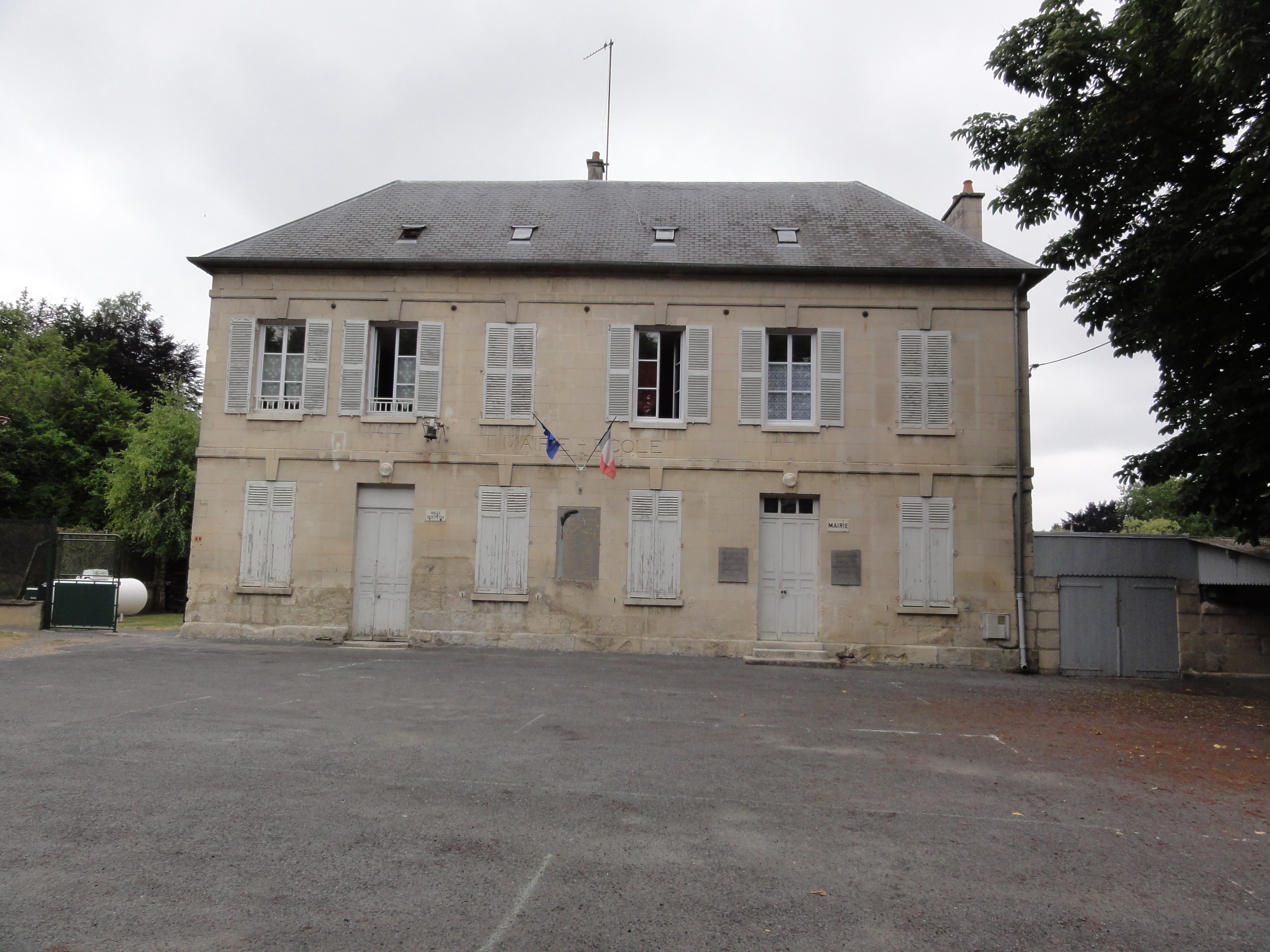
- The town hall of Rozières-sur-Crise
- Location of Rozières-sur-Crise
- Location within France Location within Hauts-de-France
- Coordinates: 49°19′39″N 3°21′20″E
- Country: France
- Region: Hauts-de-France
- Department: Aisne
- Arrondissement: Soissons
- Canton: Villers-Cotterêts
- Intercommunality: Oulchy le Château

Government
  - Mayor (2026–32): Arnaud Houssel
- Area^{1}: 7.32 km^{2} (2.83 sq mi)
- Elevation: 70 m (230 ft)
- Highest elevation: 166 m (545 ft)
- Lowest elevation: 57 m (187 ft)
- Population (2023): 239
  - Density: 32.7/km^{2} (84.6/sq mi)
- Time zone: UTC+01:00 (CET)
  - Summer (DST): UTC+02:00 (CEST)
- INSEE/Postal code: 02663 /02200
- ^{1} French Land Register data, which excludes lakes, ponds, glaciers > 1 km^{2} (0.386 sq mi or 247 acres) and river estuaries.

Rozières-sur-Crise (French pronunciation: [ʁozjɛʁ syʁ kʁiz]) is a commune in the Aisne department in Hauts-de-France in northern France.

== Population ==
Historical population
Year	Pop.	±% p.a.
1968	166	—
1975	163	−0.26%
1982	206	+3.40%
1990	271	+3.49%
1999	261	−0.42%
2007	233	−1.41%
2012	229	−0.35%
2017	227	−0.18%
2023	239	+0.86%
Source: INSEE

== See also ==
- Communes of the Aisne department
