= Bussiares =

- Commune
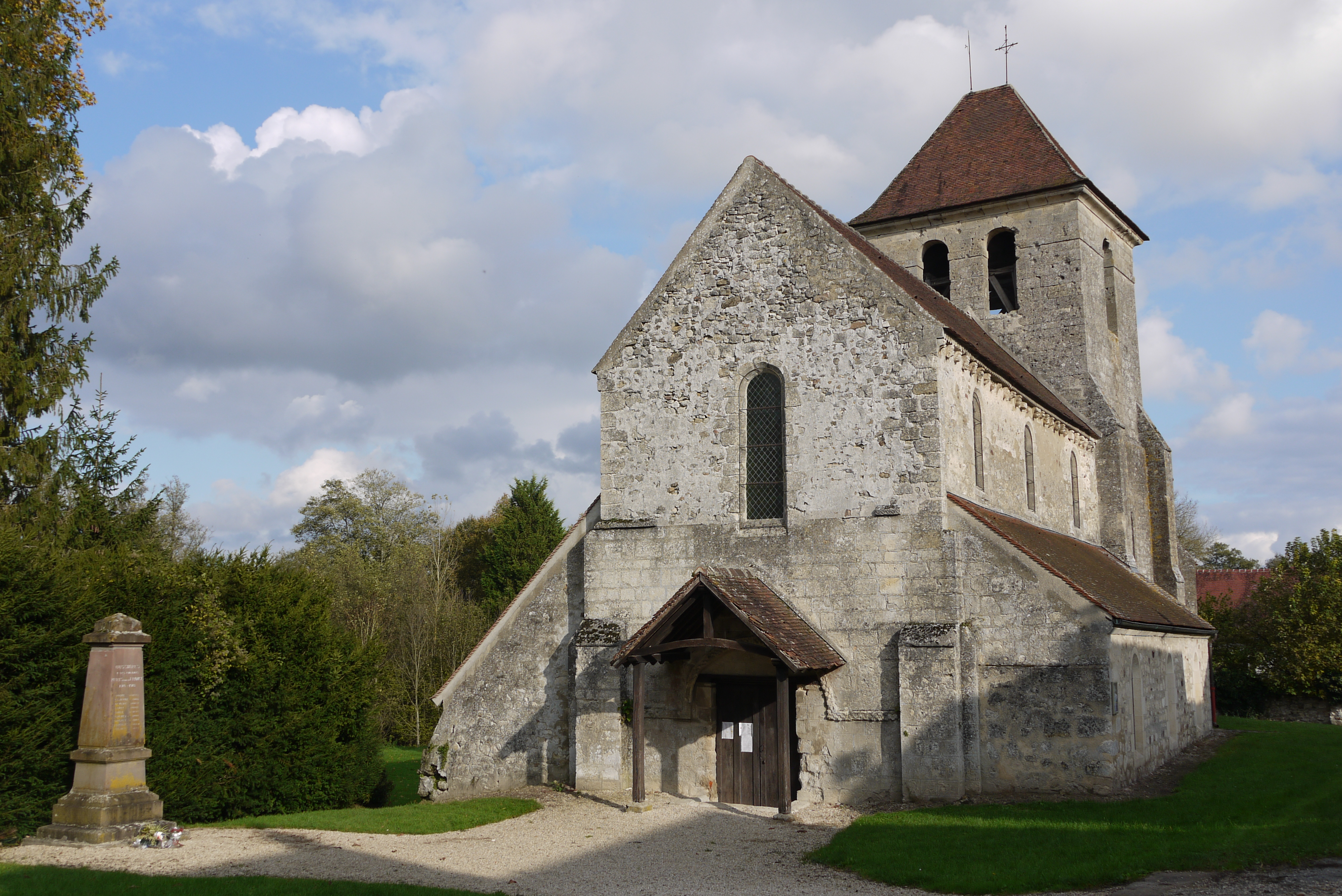
- The church of Bussiares
- Location of Bussiares
- Location within France Location within Hauts-de-France
- Coordinates: 49°05′29″N 3°15′28″E
- Country: France
- Region: Hauts-de-France
- Department: Aisne
- Arrondissement: Château-Thierry
- Canton: Villers-Cotterêts
- Intercommunality: CA Région de Château-Thierry

Government
  - Mayor (2026–32): Francis Fraeyman
- Area^{1}: 7.4 km^{2} (2.9 sq mi)
- Elevation: 150 m (490 ft)
- Highest elevation: 203 m (666 ft)
- Lowest elevation: 79 m (259 ft)
- Population (2023): 126
  - Density: 17/km^{2} (44/sq mi)
- Time zone: UTC+01:00 (CET)
  - Summer (DST): UTC+02:00 (CEST)
- INSEE/Postal code: 02137 /02810
- ^{1} French Land Register data, which excludes lakes, ponds, glaciers > 1 km^{2} (0.386 sq mi or 247 acres) and river estuaries.

Bussiares (French pronunciation: [bysjaʁ]) is a commune in the department of Aisne in Hauts-de-France in northern France.

== Population ==
Historical population
Year	Pop.	±% p.a.
1968	89	—
1975	57	−6.17%
1982	60	+0.74%
1990	75	+2.83%
1999	101	+3.36%
2007	113	+1.41%
2012	126	+2.20%
2017	152	+3.82%
2023	126	−3.08%
Source: INSEE

== See also ==
- Communes of the Aisne department
