= Haramont =

- Commune
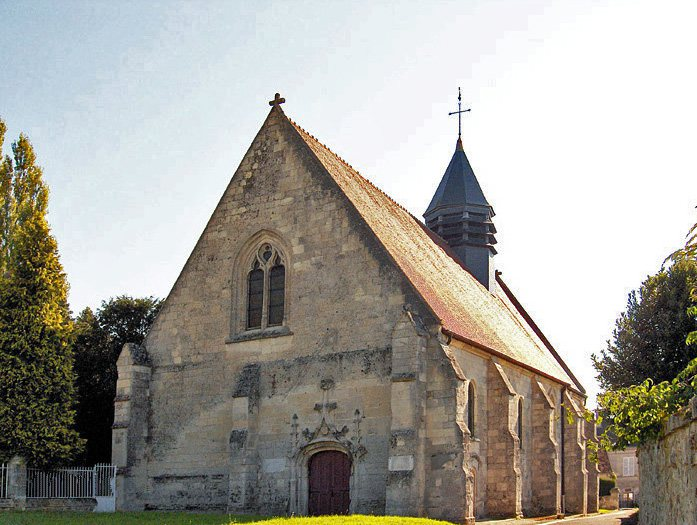
- The church of Haramont

- Coat of arms
- Location of Haramont
- Location within France Location within Hauts-de-France
- Coordinates: 49°16′44″N 3°03′45″E
- Country: France
- Region: Hauts-de-France
- Department: Aisne
- Arrondissement: Soissons
- Canton: Villers-Cotterêts

Government
  - Mayor (2026–32): Hubert Maillet
- Area^{1}: 12.24 km^{2} (4.73 sq mi)
- Elevation: 138 m (453 ft)
- Highest elevation: 243 m (797 ft)
- Lowest elevation: 75 m (246 ft)
- Population (2023): 556
  - Density: 45.4/km^{2} (118/sq mi)
- Time zone: UTC+01:00 (CET)
  - Summer (DST): UTC+02:00 (CEST)
- INSEE/Postal code: 02368 /02600
- ^{1} French Land Register data, which excludes lakes, ponds, glaciers > 1 km^{2} (0.386 sq mi or 247 acres) and river estuaries.

Haramont (French pronunciation: [aʁamɔ̃]) is a commune in the Aisne department in Hauts-de-France in northern France.

== Population ==
Historical population
| Year | Pop. | ±% p.a. |
|---|---|---|
| 1968 | 359 | — |
| 1975 | 393 | +1.30% |
| 1982 | 441 | +1.66% |
| 1990 | 518 | +2.03% |
| 1999 | 573 | +1.13% |
| 2007 | 602 | +0.62% |
| 2012 | 594 | −0.27% |
| 2017 | 580 | −0.48% |
| 2023 | 556 | −0.70% |
Source: INSEE

== Sights ==
Haramont has 17 historical monuments listed in the French Ministry of Culture database. Most notable are:

- Saint-Clément parish church The church contains pictures noted for their workmanship. The church was classified as a monument historique in 1919.
- The priory of Longpré, whose origins date back to the 12th century, classified since 1995.
- Le Manoir des Fossés, in the route de la vallée de Baudrimont, dates back to the 16th century, classified since 2003.
- The menhir called La Pierre-Clouise in the Forest of Retz, classified since 1889.

== Personalities linked to the commune ==
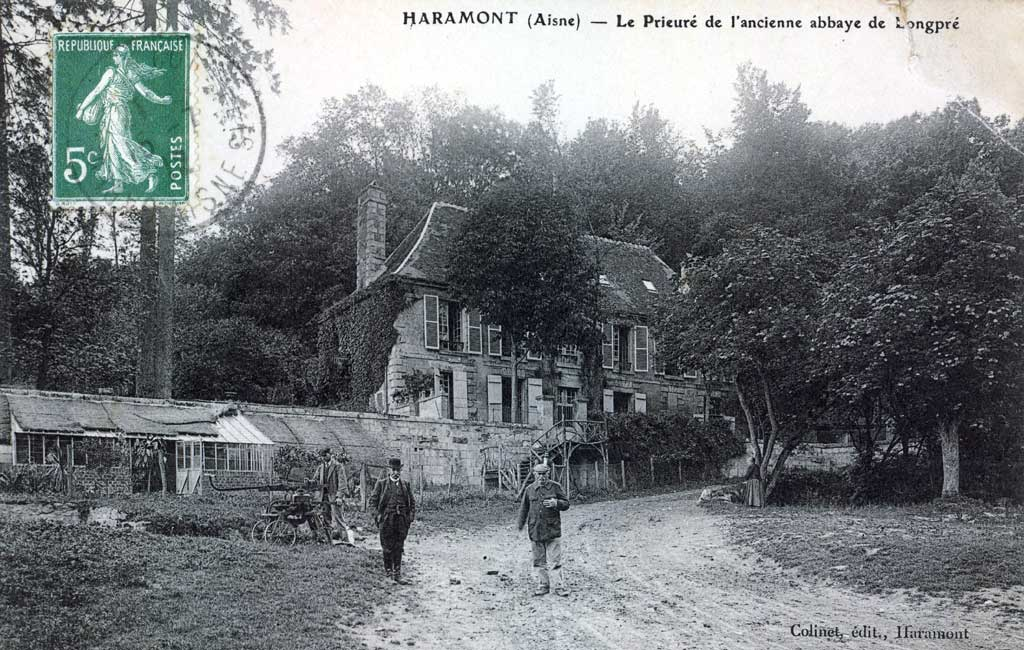
Priory of the ancient abbey

Alexandre Dumas, lived in the Manoir des Fossés during his youth. His novels Ange Pitou and Le Meneur de loups (The Wolf Leader) are set partly in the commune.

In the introduction to Le Meneur de loups, he writes:

« Du plus loin qu’il me souvienne, c’est-à-dire de l’âge de trois ans, nous habitions, mon père, ma mère et moi, un petit château nommé les Fossés, situé sur les limites des départements de l’Aisne et de l’Oise, entre Haramont et Longpré. »

("As far back as I remember, that is to say from the age of three years, we lived, my father, my mother and me, in a small château called les Fossés, situated on the border of the départements of l’Aisne and l’Oise, between Haramont and Longpré.")

== See also ==
- Communes of the Aisne department
