= Oulchy-la-Ville =

- Commune
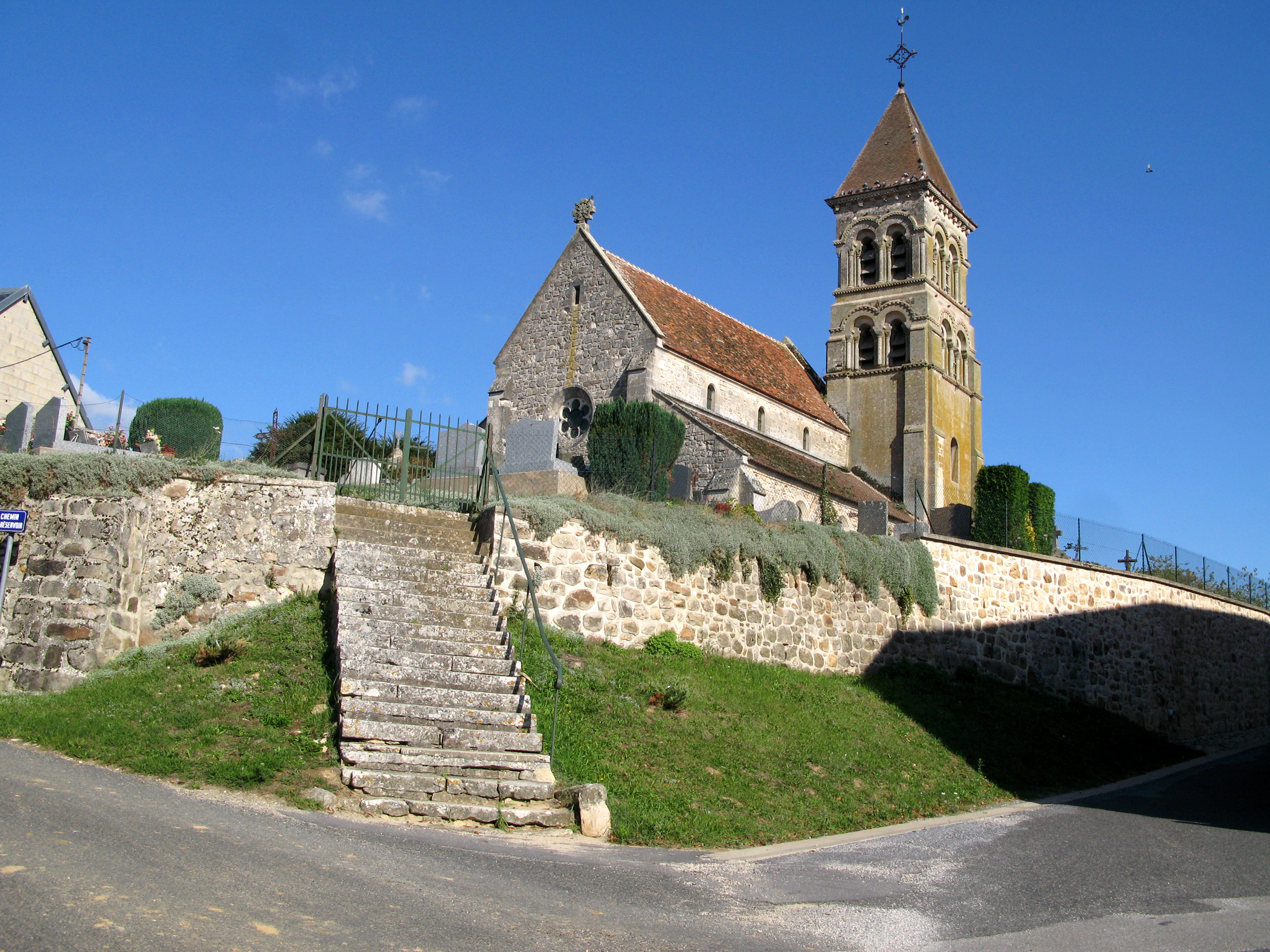
- The church of Oulchy-la-Ville
- Location of Oulchy-la-Ville
- Location within France Location within Hauts-de-France
- Coordinates: 49°12′50″N 3°21′02″E
- Country: France
- Region: Hauts-de-France
- Department: Aisne
- Arrondissement: Soissons
- Canton: Villers-Cotterêts
- Intercommunality: Oulchy le Château

Government
  - Mayor (2026–32): Christian Fouillard
- Area^{1}: 7.13 km^{2} (2.75 sq mi)
- Elevation: 120 m (390 ft)
- Highest elevation: 193 m (633 ft)
- Lowest elevation: 80 m (260 ft)
- Population (2023): 131
  - Density: 18.4/km^{2} (47.6/sq mi)
- Time zone: UTC+01:00 (CET)
  - Summer (DST): UTC+02:00 (CEST)
- INSEE/Postal code: 02579 /02210
- ^{1} French Land Register data, which excludes lakes, ponds, glaciers > 1 km^{2} (0.386 sq mi or 247 acres) and river estuaries.

Oulchy-la-Ville is a commune in the Aisne department in Hauts-de-France in northern France.

== Population ==
Historical population
Year	Pop.	±% p.a.
1968	150	—
1975	138	−1.18%
1982	140	+0.21%
1990	116	−2.32%
1999	126	+0.92%
2007	128	+0.20%
2012	124	−0.63%
2017	122	−0.32%
2023	131	+1.19%
Source: INSEE

== See also ==
- Communes of the Aisne department
