= Largny-sur-Automne =

- Commune
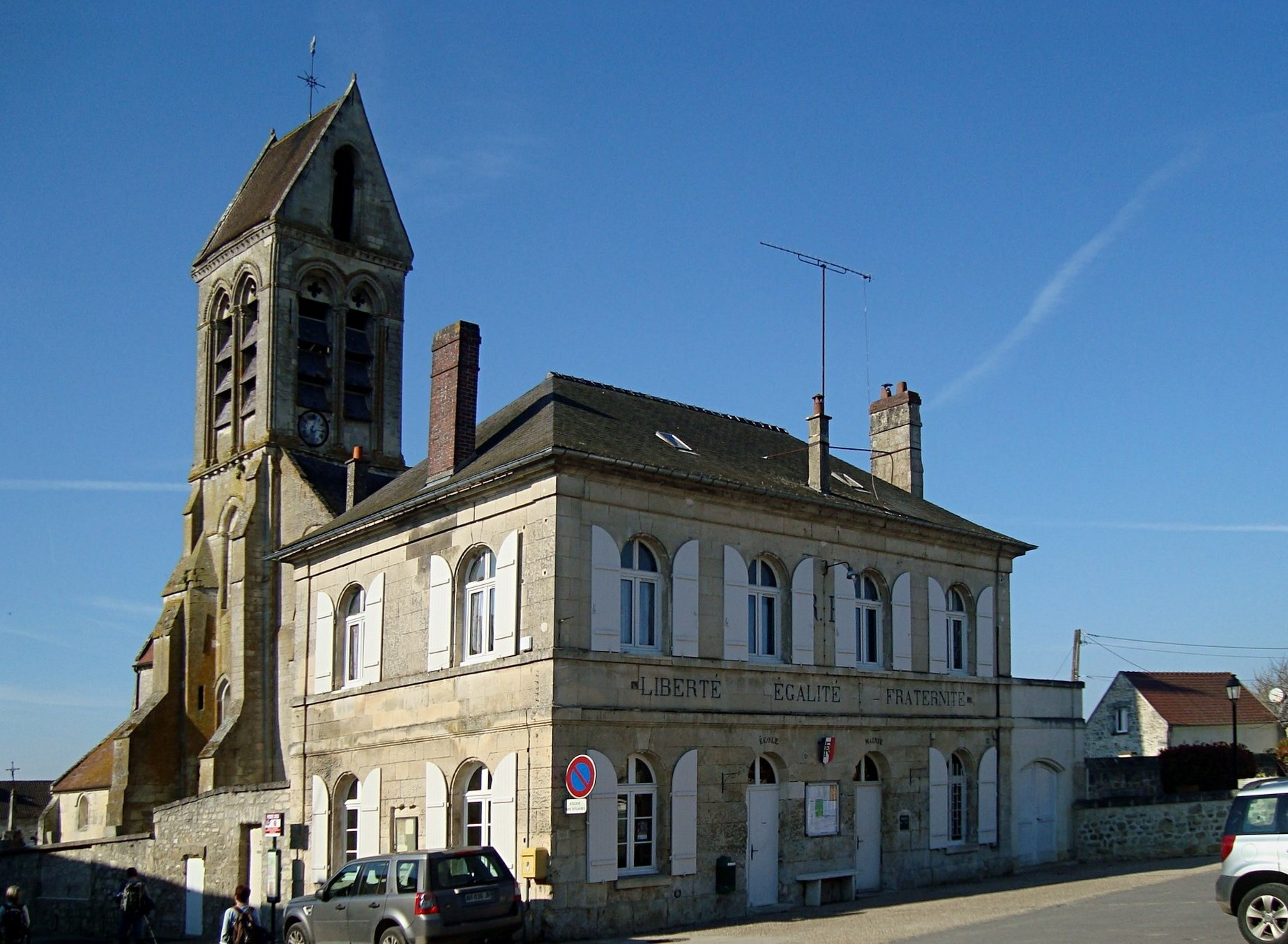
- The town hall and church of Largny-sur-Automne
- Location of Largny-sur-Automne
- Location within France Location within Hauts-de-France
- Coordinates: 49°15′40″N 3°02′31″E
- Country: France
- Region: Hauts-de-France
- Department: Aisne
- Arrondissement: Soissons
- Canton: Villers-Cotterêts

Government
  - Mayor (2026–32): Meritxell Lefranc-Carbonnel
- Area^{1}: 9.53 km^{2} (3.68 sq mi)
- Elevation: 124 m (407 ft)
- Highest elevation: 218 m (715 ft)
- Lowest elevation: 67 m (220 ft)
- Population (2023): 239
  - Density: 25.1/km^{2} (65.0/sq mi)
- Time zone: UTC+01:00 (CET)
  - Summer (DST): UTC+02:00 (CEST)
- INSEE/Postal code: 02410 /02600
- ^{1} French Land Register data, which excludes lakes, ponds, glaciers > 1 km^{2} (0.386 sq mi or 247 acres) and river estuaries.

Largny-sur-Automne is a commune in the Aisne department in Hauts-de-France in northern France.

== Population ==
Historical population
Year	Pop.	±% p.a.
1968	288	—
1975	319	+1.47%
1982	250	−3.42%
1990	244	−0.30%
1999	259	+0.67%
2007	242	−0.85%
2012	254	+0.97%
2017	244	−0.80%
2023	239	−0.34%
Source: INSEE

== Places of interest ==
The garden of Les Charmettes, dedicated to the philosopher Jean-Jacques Rousseau, was created by Auguste Castellant from 1891. The garden and the buildings and statues in it have been a listed monument since 2008.

The village church was built in the 12th and 13th centuries.
