= Canton of Villers-Cotterêts =

Coordinates: 49°15′15″N 3°05′27″E

Villers-Cotterêts
- Canton
- Interactive map of Villers-Cotterêts
- Country: France
- Region: Hauts-de-France
- Department: Aisne
- No. of communes: {{{nbcomm}}}
- Area: 708.21 km^{2} (273.44 sq mi)
- Population (2023): 29,862
  - Density: 42.165/km^{2} (109.21/sq mi)
- INSEE code: 02 21

The canton of Villers-Cotterêts is an administrative division in northern France. At the French canton reorganisation which came into effect in March 2015, the canton was expanded from 20 to 76 communes:

1. Ambrief
2. Ancienville
3. Arcy-Sainte-Restitue
4. Armentières-sur-Ourcq
5. Beugneux
6. Billy-sur-Ourcq
7. Bonnesvalyn
8. Breny
9. Brumetz
10. Bussiares
11. Buzancy
12. Chacrise
13. Chaudun
14. Chézy-en-Orxois
15. Chouy
16. Corcy
17. Courchamps
18. Coyolles
19. Cramaille
20. La Croix-sur-Ourcq
21. Cuiry-Housse
22. Dammard
23. Dampleux
24. Droizy
25. Faverolles
26. La Ferté-Milon
27. Fleury
28. Gandelu
29. Grand-Rozoy
30. Haramont
31. Hartennes-et-Taux
32. Hautevesnes
33. Largny-sur-Automne
34. Latilly
35. Launoy
36. Licy-Clignon
37. Longpont
38. Louâtre
39. Maast-et-Violaine
40. Macogny
41. Marizy-Sainte-Geneviève
42. Marizy-Saint-Mard
43. Monnes
44. Montgobert
45. Montgru-Saint-Hilaire
46. Monthiers
47. Montigny-l'Allier
48. Muret-et-Crouttes
49. Nampteuil-sous-Muret
50. Neuilly-Saint-Front
51. Noroy-sur-Ourcq
52. Oigny-en-Valois
53. Oulchy-la-Ville
54. Oulchy-le-Château
55. Parcy-et-Tigny
56. Passy-en-Valois
57. Le Plessier-Huleu
58. Priez
59. Puiseux-en-Retz
60. Retheuil
61. Rozet-Saint-Albin
62. Rozières-sur-Crise
63. Saint-Gengoulph
64. Saint-Rémy-Blanzy
65. Silly-la-Poterie
66. Sommelans
67. Soucy
68. Taillefontaine
69. Torcy-en-Valois
70. Troësnes
71. Vichel-Nanteuil
72. Vierzy
73. Villemontoire
74. Villers-Cotterêts
75. Villers-Hélon
76. Vivières

== Demographics ==
Historical population
Year	Pop.	±% p.a.
2013	31,193	—
2018	30,487	−0.46%
Source: INSEE

== See also ==
- Cantons of the Aisne department
