= Macogny =

- Commune
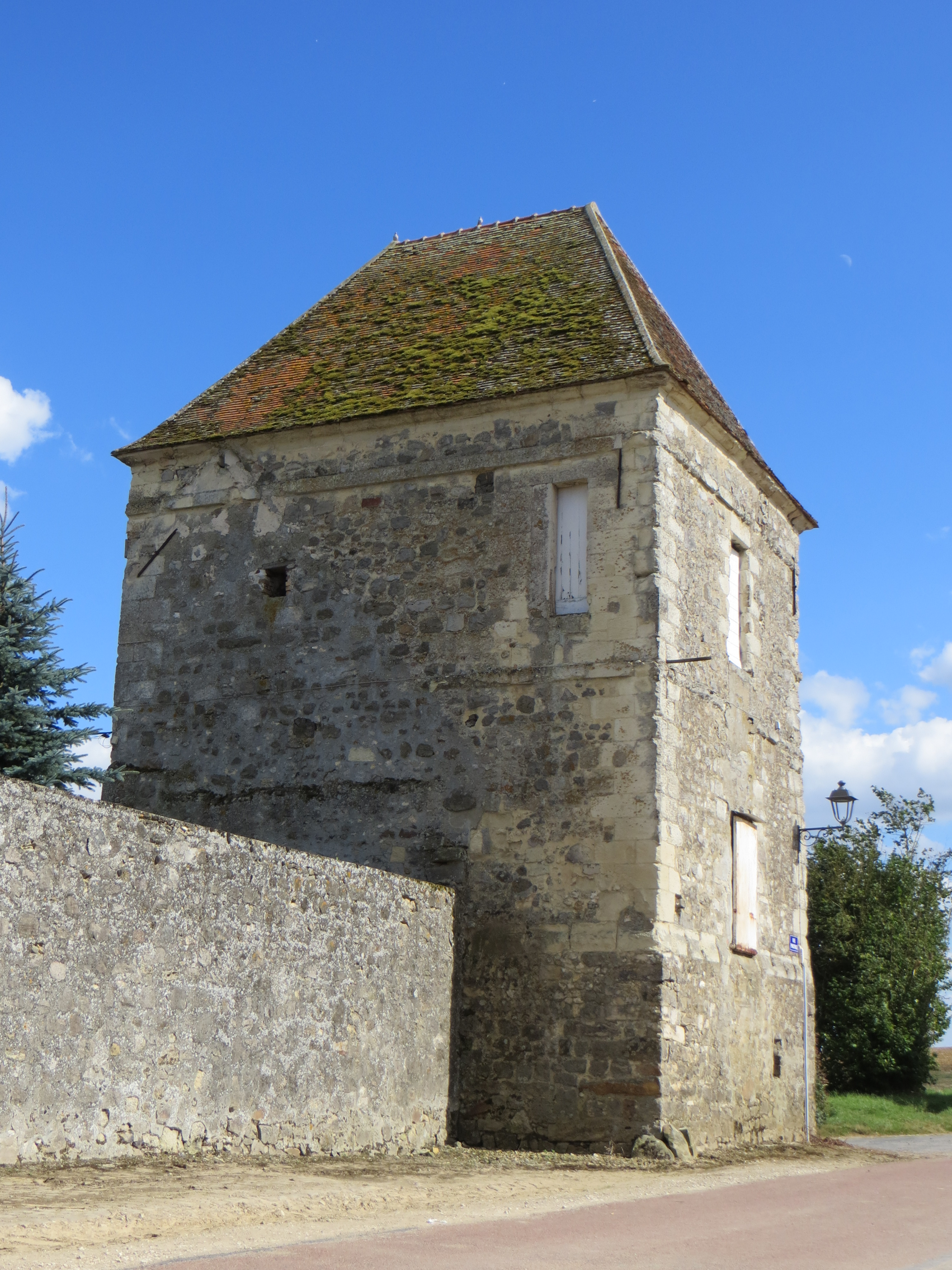
- A farm building of Macogny
- Location of Macogny
- Location within France Location within Hauts-de-France
- Coordinates: 49°09′57″N 3°13′49″E
- Country: France
- Region: Hauts-de-France
- Department: Aisne
- Arrondissement: Soissons
- Canton: Villers-Cotterêts

Government
  - Mayor (2026–32): Geoffroy Quenardel
- Area^{1}: 6.17 km^{2} (2.38 sq mi)
- Elevation: 140 m (460 ft)
- Highest elevation: 162 m (531 ft)
- Lowest elevation: 99 m (325 ft)
- Population (2023): 64
  - Density: 10/km^{2} (27/sq mi)
- Time zone: UTC+01:00 (CET)
  - Summer (DST): UTC+02:00 (CEST)
- INSEE/Postal code: 02449 /02470
- ^{1} French Land Register data, which excludes lakes, ponds, glaciers > 1 km^{2} (0.386 sq mi or 247 acres) and river estuaries.

Macogny (French pronunciation: [makɔɲi]) is a commune in the Aisne department in Hauts-de-France in northern France.

== Population ==
Historical population
Year	Pop.	±% p.a.
1968	65	—
1975	57	−1.86%
1982	50	−1.85%
1990	53	+0.73%
1999	56	+0.61%
2007	70	+2.83%
2012	81	+2.96%
2017	73	−2.06%
2023	64	−2.17%
Source: INSEE

== See also ==
- Communes of the Aisne department
