= Launoy, Aisne =

Launoy
- Commune
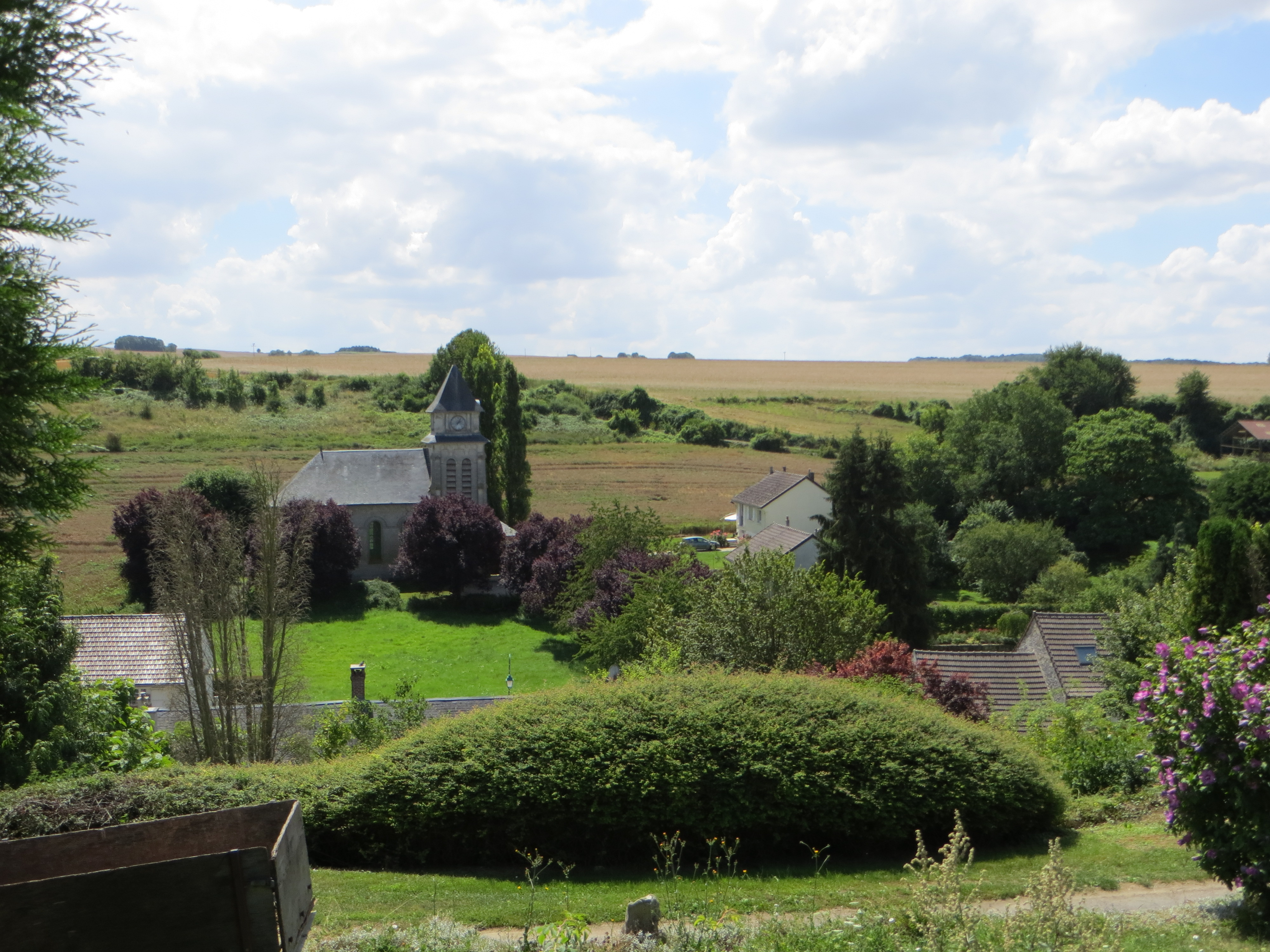
- The church of Launoy
- Location of Launoy
- Location within France Location within Hauts-de-France
- Coordinates: 49°15′52″N 3°24′05″E
- Country: France
- Region: Hauts-de-France
- Department: Aisne
- Arrondissement: Soissons
- Canton: Villers-Cotterêts
- Intercommunality: Oulchy le Château

Government
  - Mayor (2026–32): Christelle Richard
- Area^{1}: 9.1 km^{2} (3.5 sq mi)
- Elevation: 115 m (377 ft)
- Highest elevation: 201 m (659 ft)
- Lowest elevation: 88 m (289 ft)
- Population (2023): 96
  - Density: 11/km^{2} (27/sq mi)
- Time zone: UTC+01:00 (CET)
  - Summer (DST): UTC+02:00 (CEST)
- INSEE/Postal code: 02412 /02210
- ^{1} French Land Register data, which excludes lakes, ponds, glaciers > 1 km^{2} (0.386 sq mi or 247 acres) and river estuaries.

Launoy (French pronunciation: [lonwa]) is a commune in the Aisne department in Hauts-de-France in northern France.

== Population ==
Historical population
Year	Pop.	±% p.a.
1968	83	—
1975	75	−1.44%
1982	71	−0.78%
1990	63	−1.48%
1999	69	+1.02%
2007	96	+4.21%
2012	102	+1.22%
2017	99	−0.60%
2023	96	−0.51%
Source: INSEE

== See also ==
- Communes of the Aisne department
