= Marizy-Saint-Mard =

- Commune
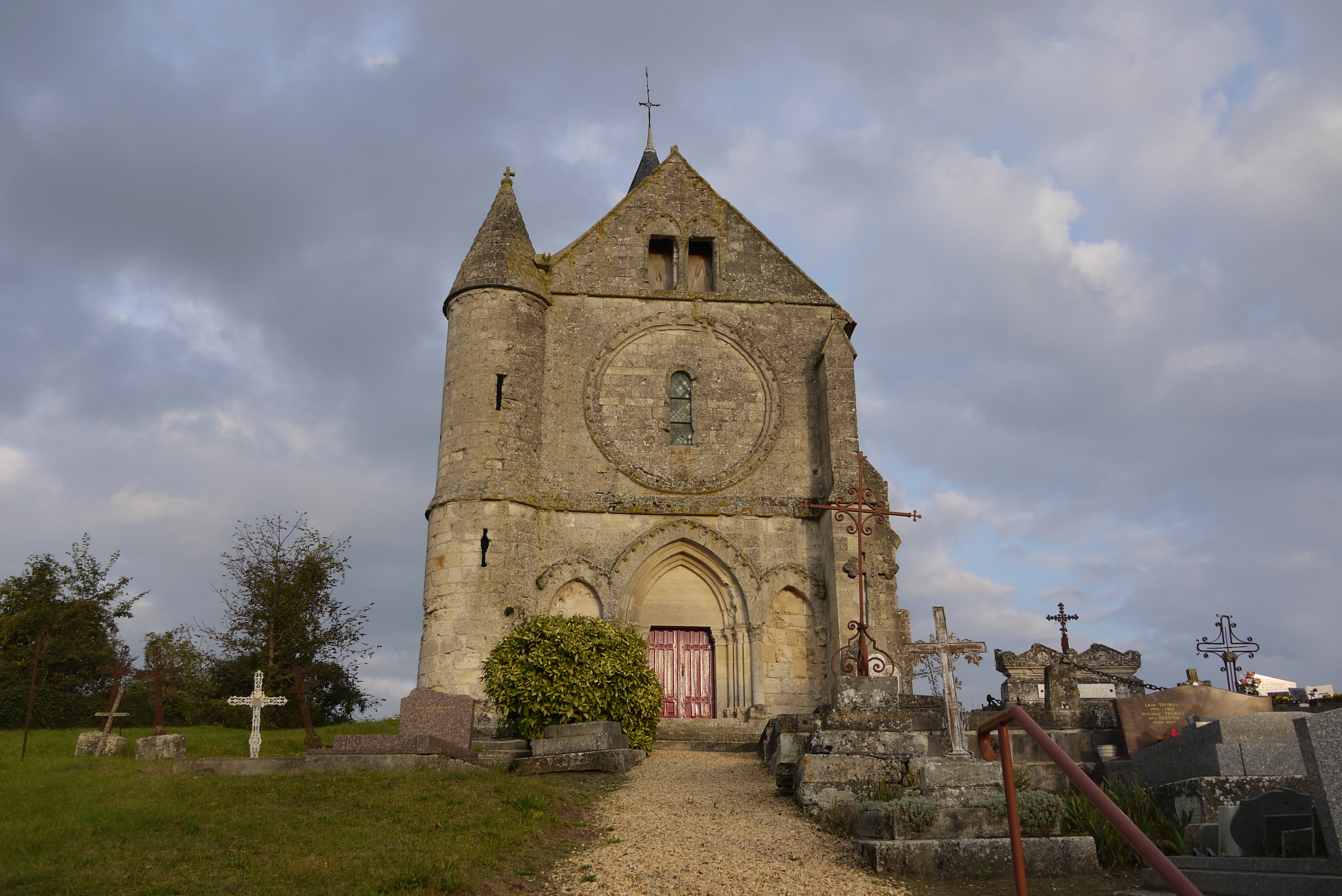
- The church of Marizy-Saint-Mard
- Location of Marizy-Saint-Mard
- Location within France Location within Hauts-de-France
- Coordinates: 49°10′54″N 3°13′30″E
- Country: France
- Region: Hauts-de-France
- Department: Aisne
- Arrondissement: Soissons
- Canton: Villers-Cotterêts

Government
  - Mayor (2026–32): Damien Ghekiere
- Area^{1}: 4.54 km^{2} (1.75 sq mi)
- Elevation: 96 m (315 ft)
- Highest elevation: 155 m (509 ft)
- Lowest elevation: 72 m (236 ft)
- Population (2023): 47
  - Density: 10/km^{2} (27/sq mi)
- Time zone: UTC+01:00 (CET)
  - Summer (DST): UTC+02:00 (CEST)
- INSEE/Postal code: 02467 /02470
- ^{1} French Land Register data, which excludes lakes, ponds, glaciers > 1 km^{2} (0.386 sq mi or 247 acres) and river estuaries.

Marizy-Saint-Mard is a commune in the Aisne department in Hauts-de-France in northern France.

== Population ==
Historical population
Year	Pop.	±% p.a.
1968	90	—
1975	53	−7.29%
1982	34	−6.14%
1990	49	+4.67%
1999	55	+1.29%
2007	45	−2.48%
2012	55	+4.10%
2017	50	−1.89%
2023	47	−1.03%
Source: INSEE

== See also ==
- Communes of the Aisne department
