= Canton of Oulchy-le-Château =

Coordinates: 49°12′14″N 3°22′04″E

Oulchy-le-Château
- Former canton
- Interactive map of Oulchy-le-Château
- Country: France
- Region: Hauts-de-France
- Department: Aisne
- No. of communes: {{{nbcomm}}}
- Disbanded: 2015
- Area: 231.76 km^{2} (89.48 sq mi)
- Population (2012): 5,715
  - Density: 24.66/km^{2} (63.87/sq mi)

The canton of Oulchy-le-Château is a former administrative division in northern France. It was disbanded following the French canton reorganisation which came into effect in March 2015. It consisted of 26 communes, which joined the canton of Villers-Cotterêts in 2015. It had 5,715 inhabitants (2012).

The canton comprised the following communes:

- Ambrief
- Arcy-Sainte-Restitue
- Beugneux
- Billy-sur-Ourcq
- Breny
- Buzancy
- Chacrise
- Chaudun
- Cramaille
- Cuiry-Housse
- Droizy
- Hartennes-et-Taux
- Launoy
- Maast-et-Violaine
- Montgru-Saint-Hilaire
- Muret-et-Crouttes
- Nampteuil-sous-Muret
- Oulchy-la-Ville
- Oulchy-le-Château
- Parcy-et-Tigny
- Le Plessier-Huleu
- Rozières-sur-Crise
- Grand-Rozoy
- Saint-Rémy-Blanzy
- Vierzy
- Villemontoire

== Demographics ==
Historical population Canton of Oulchy-le-Château
Year	1962	1968	1975	1982	1990	1999
Pop.	4,964	5,562	5,052	5,042	5,347	5,468
±%	—	+12.0%	−9.2%	−0.2%	+6.0%	+2.3%
From the year 1962 on: No double counting – residents of multiple communes (e.g. students and military personnel) are counted only once. Source: INSEE

== See also ==
- Cantons of the Aisne department
