= Arrondissement of Soissons =

Coordinates: 49°23′N 3°19′E

Soissons
- Arrondissement
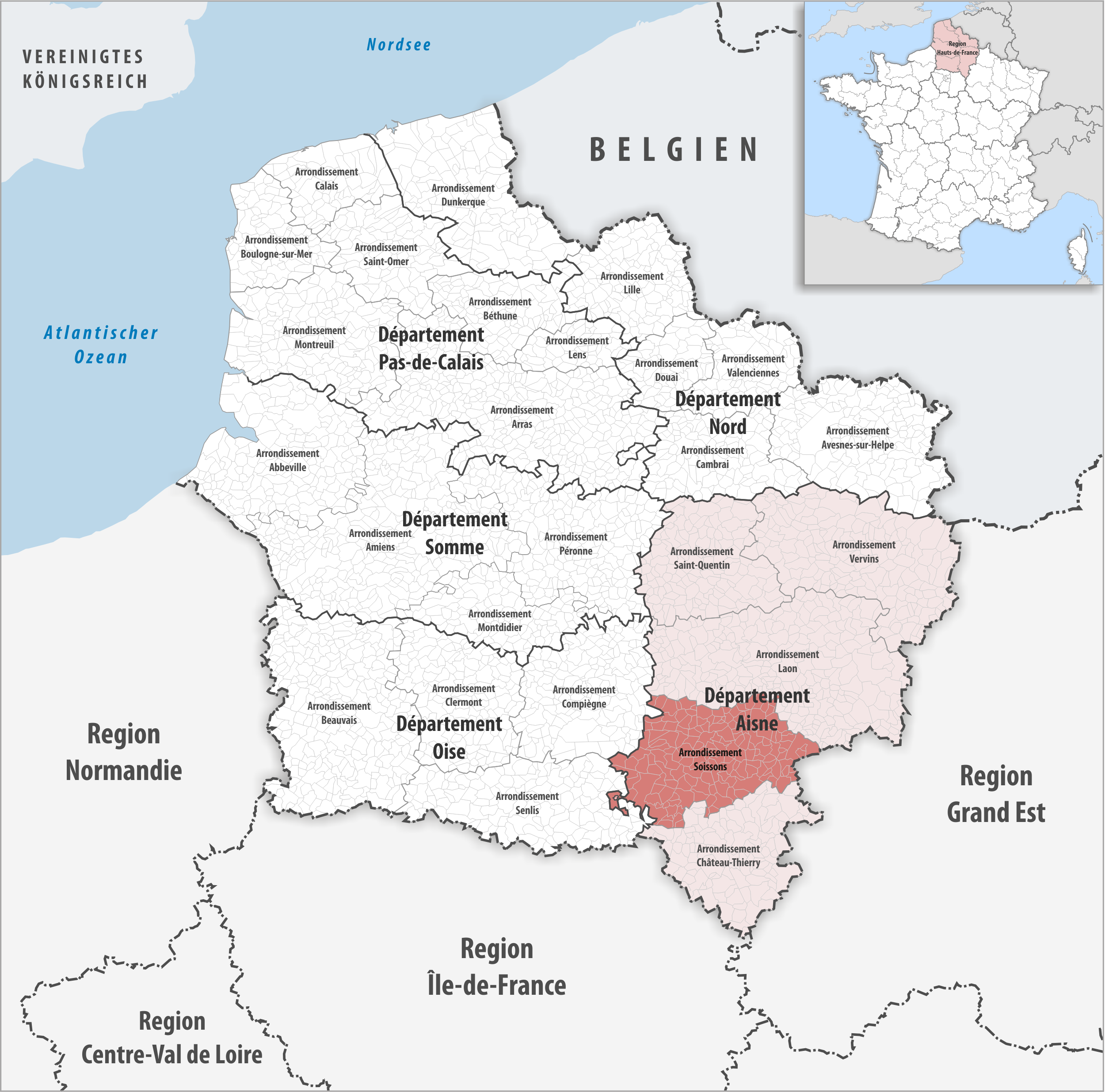
- Location within the region Hauts-de-France
- Country: France
- Region: Hauts-de-France
- Department: Aisne
- No. of communes: {{{nbcomm}}}
- Area: 1,342.3 km^{2} (518.3 sq mi)
- Population (2023): 106,668
  - Density: 79.467/km^{2} (205.82/sq mi)
- INSEE code: 024

The arrondissement of Soissons is an arrondissement of France in the Aisne department in the Hauts-de-France region. It has 163 communes. Its population is 107,344 (2021), and its area is 1,342.3 km^{2} (518.3 sq mi).

== Composition ==
The communes of the arrondissement of Soissons, and their INSEE codes are:

1. Acy (02003)
2. Aizy-Jouy (02008)
3. Allemant (02010)
4. Ambleny (02011)
5. Ambrief (02012)
6. Ancienville (02015)
7. Arcy-Sainte-Restitue (02022)
8. Audignicourt (02034)
9. Augy (02036)
10. Bagneux (02043)
11. Bazoches-et-Saint-Thibaut (02054)
12. Belleu (02064)
13. Bernoy-le-Château (02564)
14. Berny-Rivière (02071)
15. Beugneux (02082)
16. Bieuxy (02087)
17. Billy-sur-Aisne (02089)
18. Billy-sur-Ourcq (02090)
19. Blanzy-lès-Fismes (02091)
20. Braine (02110)
21. Braye (02118)
22. Brenelle (02120)
23. Breny (02121)
24. Bruys (02129)
25. Bucy-le-Long (02131)
26. Buzancy (02138)
27. Celles-sur-Aisne (02148)
28. Cerseuil (02152)
29. Chacrise (02154)
30. Chassemy (02167)
31. Chaudun (02172)
32. Chavignon (02174)
33. Chavigny (02175)
34. Chavonne (02176)
35. Chéry-Chartreuve (02179)
36. Chivres-Val (02190)
37. Chouy (02192)
38. Ciry-Salsogne (02195)
39. Clamecy (02198)
40. Cœuvres-et-Valsery (02201)
41. Condé-sur-Aisne (02210)
42. Corcy (02216)
43. Courcelles-sur-Vesle (02224)
44. Courmelles (02226)
45. Couvrelles (02230)
46. Coyolles (02232)
47. Cramaille (02233)
48. Crouy (02243)
49. Cuffies (02245)
50. Cuiry-Housse (02249)
51. Cuisy-en-Almont (02253)
52. Cutry (02254)
53. Cys-la-Commune (02255)
54. Dammard (02258)
55. Dampleux (02259)
56. Dhuizel (02263)
57. Dommiers (02267)
58. Droizy (02272)
59. Épagny (02277)
60. Faverolles (02302)
61. La Ferté-Milon (02307)
62. Fleury (02316)
63. Fontenoy (02326)
64. Grand-Rozoy (02665)
65. Haramont (02368)
66. Hartennes-et-Taux (02372)
67. Jouaignes (02393)
68. Juvigny (02398)
69. Laffaux (02400)
70. Largny-sur-Automne (02410)
71. Launoy (02412)
72. Laversine (02415)
73. Lesges (02421)
74. Leury (02424)
75. Lhuys (02427)
76. Limé (02432)
77. Longpont (02438)
78. Louâtre (02441)
79. Maast-et-Violaine (02447)
80. Macogny (02449)
81. Margival (02464)
82. Marizy-Sainte-Geneviève (02466)
83. Marizy-Saint-Mard (02467)
84. Mercin-et-Vaux (02477)
85. Missy-aux-Bois (02485)
86. Missy-sur-Aisne (02487)
87. Monampteuil (02490)
88. Monnes (02496)
89. Mont-Notre-Dame (02520)
90. Mont-Saint-Martin (02523)
91. Montgobert (02506)
92. Montgru-Saint-Hilaire (02507)
93. Montigny-Lengrain (02514)
94. Morsain (02527)
95. Mortefontaine (02528)
96. Muret-et-Crouttes (02533)
97. Nampteuil-sous-Muret (02536)
98. Nanteuil-la-Fosse (02537)
99. Neuville-sur-Margival (02551)
100. Noroy-sur-Ourcq (02557)
101. Nouvron-Vingré (02562)
102. Oigny-en-Valois (02568)
103. Osly-Courtil (02576)
104. Ostel (02577)
105. Oulchy-la-Ville (02579)
106. Oulchy-le-Château (02580)
107. Paars (02581)
108. Parcy-et-Tigny (02585)
109. Pargny-et-Filain (02589)
110. Pasly (02593)
111. Passy-en-Valois (02594)
112. Pernant (02598)
113. Le Plessier-Huleu (02606)
114. Ploisy (02607)
115. Pommiers (02610)
116. Pont-Arcy (02612)
117. Presles-et-Boves (02620)
118. Puiseux-en-Retz (02628)
119. Quincy-sous-le-Mont (02633)
120. Ressons-le-Long (02643)
121. Retheuil (02644)
122. Rozières-sur-Crise (02663)
123. Saconin-et-Breuil (02667)
124. Saint-Bandry (02672)
125. Saint-Christophe-à-Berry (02673)
126. Saint-Mard (02682)
127. Saint-Pierre-Aigle (02687)
128. Saint-Rémy-Blanzy (02693)
129. Sancy-les-Cheminots (02698)
130. Septmonts (02706)
131. Les Septvallons (02439)
132. Serches (02711)
133. Sermoise (02714)
134. Serval (02715)
135. Silly-la-Poterie (02718)
136. Soissons (02722)
137. Soucy (02729)
138. Soupir (02730)
139. Taillefontaine (02734)
140. Tannières (02735)
141. Tartiers (02736)
142. Terny-Sorny (02739)
143. Troësnes (02749)
144. Vailly-sur-Aisne (02758)
145. Vassens (02762)
146. Vasseny (02763)
147. Vaudesson (02766)
148. Vauxbuin (02770)
149. Vauxrezis (02767)
150. Vauxtin (02773)
151. Venizel (02780)
152. Vézaponin (02793)
153. Vic-sur-Aisne (02795)
154. Viel-Arcy (02797)
155. Vierzy (02799)
156. Ville-Savoye (02817)
157. Villemontoire (02804)
158. Villeneuve-Saint-Germain (02805)
159. Villers-Cotterêts (02810)
160. Villers-Hélon (02812)
161. Vivières (02822)
162. Vregny (02828)
163. Vuillery (02829)

== History ==
The arrondissement of Soissons was created in 1800. At the January 2017 reorganization of the arrondissements of Aisne, it received three communes from the arrondissement of Laon and 10 from the arrondissement of Château-Thierry.

As a result of the reorganisation of the cantons of France which came into effect in 2015, the borders of the cantons are no longer related to the borders of the arrondissements. The cantons of the arrondissement of Soissons were, as of January 2015:

1. Braine
2. Oulchy-le-Château
3. Soissons-Nord
4. Soissons-Sud
5. Vailly-sur-Aisne
6. Vic-sur-Aisne
7. Villers-Cotterêts
