= 02460 =

02460 may refer to:

- Newtonville, Massachusetts, U.S., a village of Newton, Massachusetts
- Several communes in Aisne department, France:
  - La Ferte-Milon
  - Marcy-sous-Marle
  - Silly-la-Poterie
  - Troësnes
