= Clamecy =

Clamecy may refer to:

- Clamecy, Aisne, France
- Clamecy, Nièvre, France

== See also ==
- Roman Catholic Diocese of Bethléem à Clamecy
