= Augy =

Augy may refer to the following places in France:

- Augy, Aisne, a commune in the department of Aisne
- Augy, Yonne, a commune in the department of Yonne
- Augy-sur-Aubois, a commune in the department of Cher
