= Chouy =

- Commune
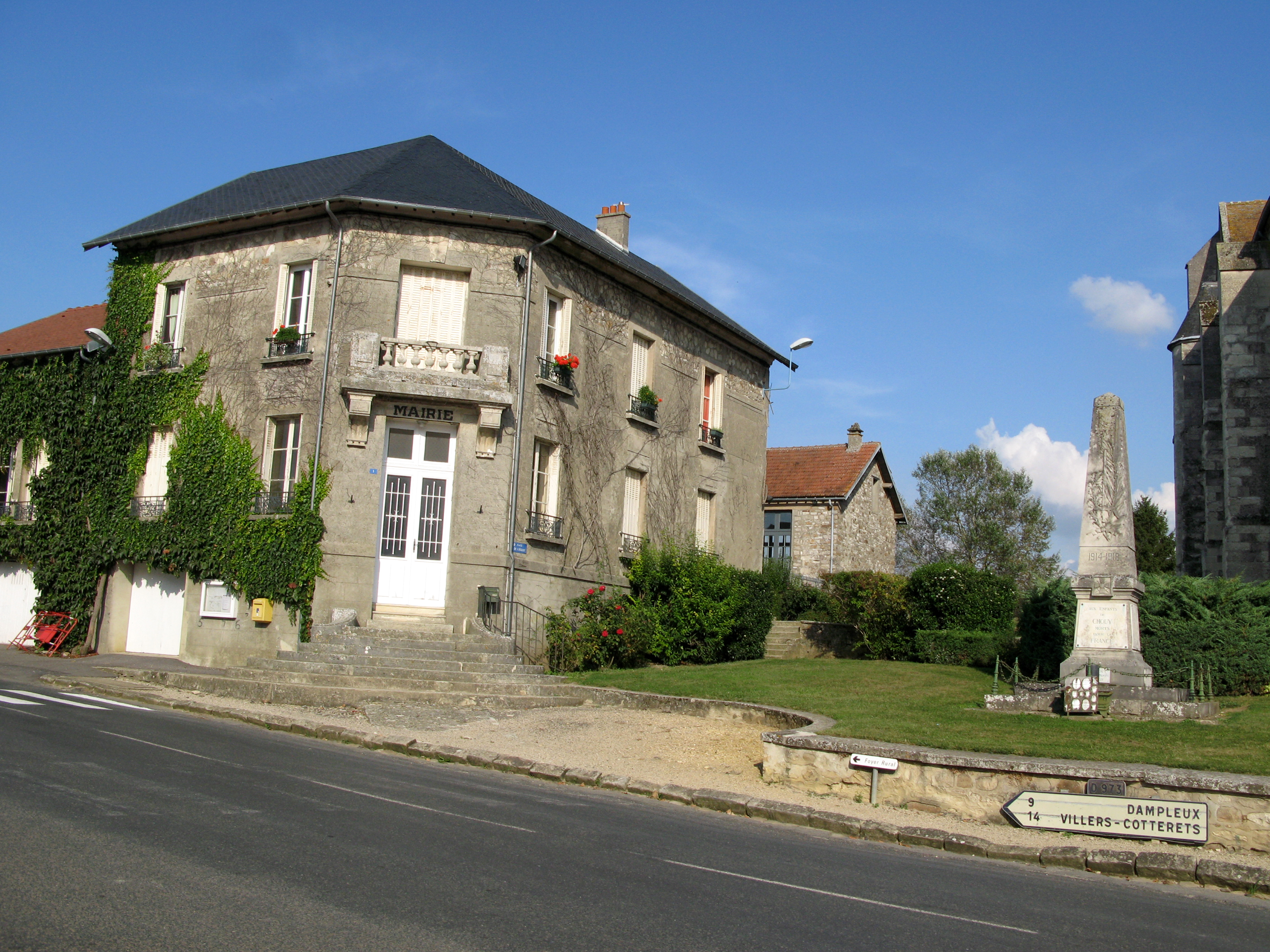
- Town hall

- Coat of arms
- Location of Chouy
- Location within France Location within Hauts-de-France
- Coordinates: 49°12′24″N 3°14′56″E
- Country: France
- Region: Hauts-de-France
- Department: Aisne
- Arrondissement: Soissons
- Canton: Villers-Cotterêts

Government
  - Mayor (2026–32): Vincent Philipon
- Area^{1}: 20.03 km^{2} (7.73 sq mi)
- Elevation: 173 m (568 ft)
- Highest elevation: 191 m (627 ft)
- Lowest elevation: 72 m (236 ft)
- Population (2023): 364
  - Density: 18.2/km^{2} (47.1/sq mi)
- Time zone: UTC+01:00 (CET)
  - Summer (DST): UTC+02:00 (CEST)
- INSEE/Postal code: 02192 /02210
- ^{1} French Land Register data, which excludes lakes, ponds, glaciers > 1 km^{2} (0.386 sq mi or 247 acres) and river estuaries.

Chouy (French pronunciation: [ʃwi]) is a commune in the Aisne department in Hauts-de-France in northern France.

== Population ==
Historical population
Year	Pop.	±% p.a.
1968	306	—
1975	278	−1.36%
1982	239	−2.14%
1990	269	+1.49%
1999	318	+1.88%
2007	377	+2.15%
2012	390	+0.68%
2017	370	−1.05%
2023	364	−0.27%
Source: INSEE

== See also ==
- Communes of the Aisne department
