= Chéry-Chartreuve =

- Commune
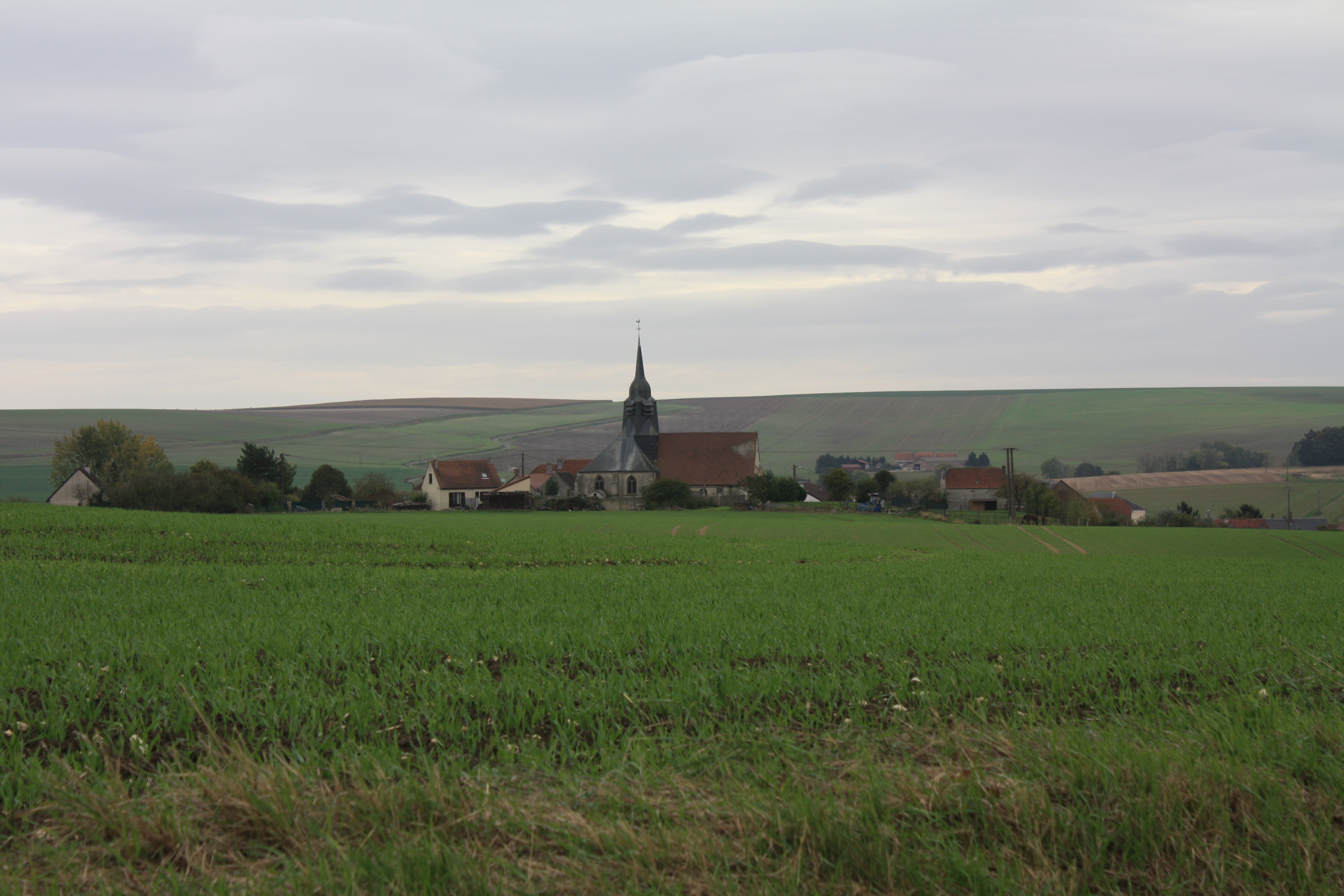
- A general view of Chéry-Chartreuve
- Location of Chéry-Chartreuve
- Location within France Location within Hauts-de-France
- Coordinates: 49°15′48″N 3°36′52″E
- Country: France
- Region: Hauts-de-France
- Department: Aisne
- Arrondissement: Soissons
- Canton: Fère-en-Tardenois
- Intercommunality: Val de l'Aisne

Government
  - Mayor (2026–32): Nicolas Morel
- Area^{1}: 13.69 km^{2} (5.29 sq mi)
- Elevation: 140 m (460 ft)
- Highest elevation: 207 m (679 ft)
- Lowest elevation: 92 m (302 ft)
- Population (2023): 378
  - Density: 27.6/km^{2} (71.5/sq mi)
- Time zone: UTC+01:00 (CET)
  - Summer (DST): UTC+02:00 (CEST)
- INSEE/Postal code: 02179 /02220
- ^{1} French Land Register data, which excludes lakes, ponds, glaciers > 1 km^{2} (0.386 sq mi or 247 acres) and river estuaries.

Chéry-Chartreuve (French pronunciation: [ʃeʁi ʃaʁtʁœv]) is a commune in the Aisne department in Hauts-de-France in northern France.

== Population ==
Historical population
| Year | Pop. | ±% p.a. |
|---|---|---|
| 1968 | 305 | — |
| 1975 | 279 | −1.26% |
| 1982 | 271 | −0.41% |
| 1990 | 293 | +0.98% |
| 1999 | 309 | +0.59% |
| 2007 | 324 | +0.59% |
| 2012 | 338 | +0.85% |
| 2017 | 392 | +3.01% |
| 2023 | 378 | −0.60% |
Source: INSEE

== See also ==
- Communes of the Aisne department
