= Corcy =

- Commune
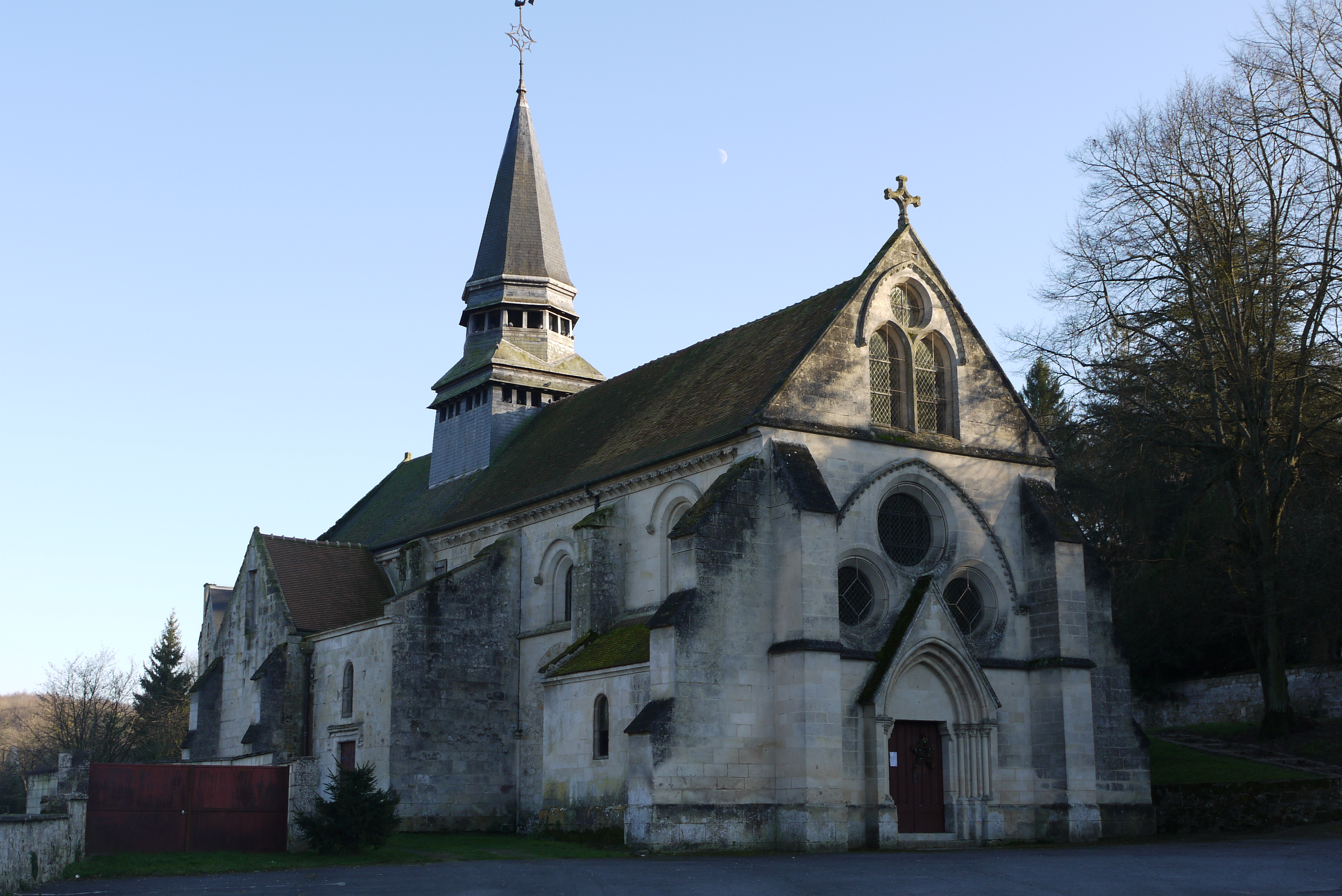
- The church of Corcy
- Location of Corcy
- Location within France Location within Hauts-de-France
- Coordinates: 49°15′17″N 3°12′45″E
- Country: France
- Region: Hauts-de-France
- Department: Aisne
- Arrondissement: Soissons
- Canton: Villers-Cotterêts

Government
  - Mayor (2026–32): Yves Disant
- Area^{1}: 7.25 km^{2} (2.80 sq mi)
- Elevation: 82 m (269 ft)
- Highest elevation: 155 m (509 ft)
- Lowest elevation: 77 m (253 ft)
- Population (2023): 332
  - Density: 45.8/km^{2} (119/sq mi)
- Time zone: UTC+01:00 (CET)
  - Summer (DST): UTC+02:00 (CEST)
- INSEE/Postal code: 02216 /02600
- ^{1} French Land Register data, which excludes lakes, ponds, glaciers > 1 km^{2} (0.386 sq mi or 247 acres) and river estuaries.

Corcy (French pronunciation: [kɔʁsi]) is a commune in the Aisne department in Hauts-de-France in northern France.

== History ==
=== Early history ===
The foundation date of Corcy is unknown. The name of the village, recorded in the form Corciacus, suggests a Gallo-Roman origin. Archaeological discoveries, including building remains, roof tiles and pottery fragments, provide evidence of occupation during the Gallo-Roman period. The settlement developed near the Roman road linking Soissons and Meaux.

=== Early modern period ===
During the French Revolution, ecclesiastical properties in Corcy were transferred to new owners. The mill and pond belonging to Notre-Dame Abbey in Soissons were sold in 1791. Other properties associated with the Charterhouse of Bourgfontaine remained in use for the transportation of timber towards Paris.

During the 19th century, the village underwent several changes, including the construction of a town hall and school, the establishment of a new cemetery and the arrival of the railway.

=== First World War ===
In 1918, Corcy was subjected to bombardments and became the site of intense fighting. The village suffered extensive destruction during the German offensive and the subsequent Allied operations.

For the conduct of its inhabitants during the bombardments and German occupation, Corcy was cited in the order of the Army and awarded the Croix de guerre by decree of 26 October 1920.

The reconstruction of the village took place largely during the interwar period. It was organised through a cooperative directed by architect Frédéric Bertrand. The village church, listed as a Monument historique on 20 February 1920, was also restored during this period.

== Population ==
Historical population
Year	Pop.	±% p.a.
1968	183	—
1975	204	+1.56%
1982	187	−1.24%
1990	254	+3.90%
1999	306	+2.09%
2007	309	+0.12%
2012	321	+0.76%
2017	306	−0.95%
2023	332	+1.37%
Source: INSEE

== See also ==
- Communes of the Aisne department
