= Passy-en-Valois =

- Commune
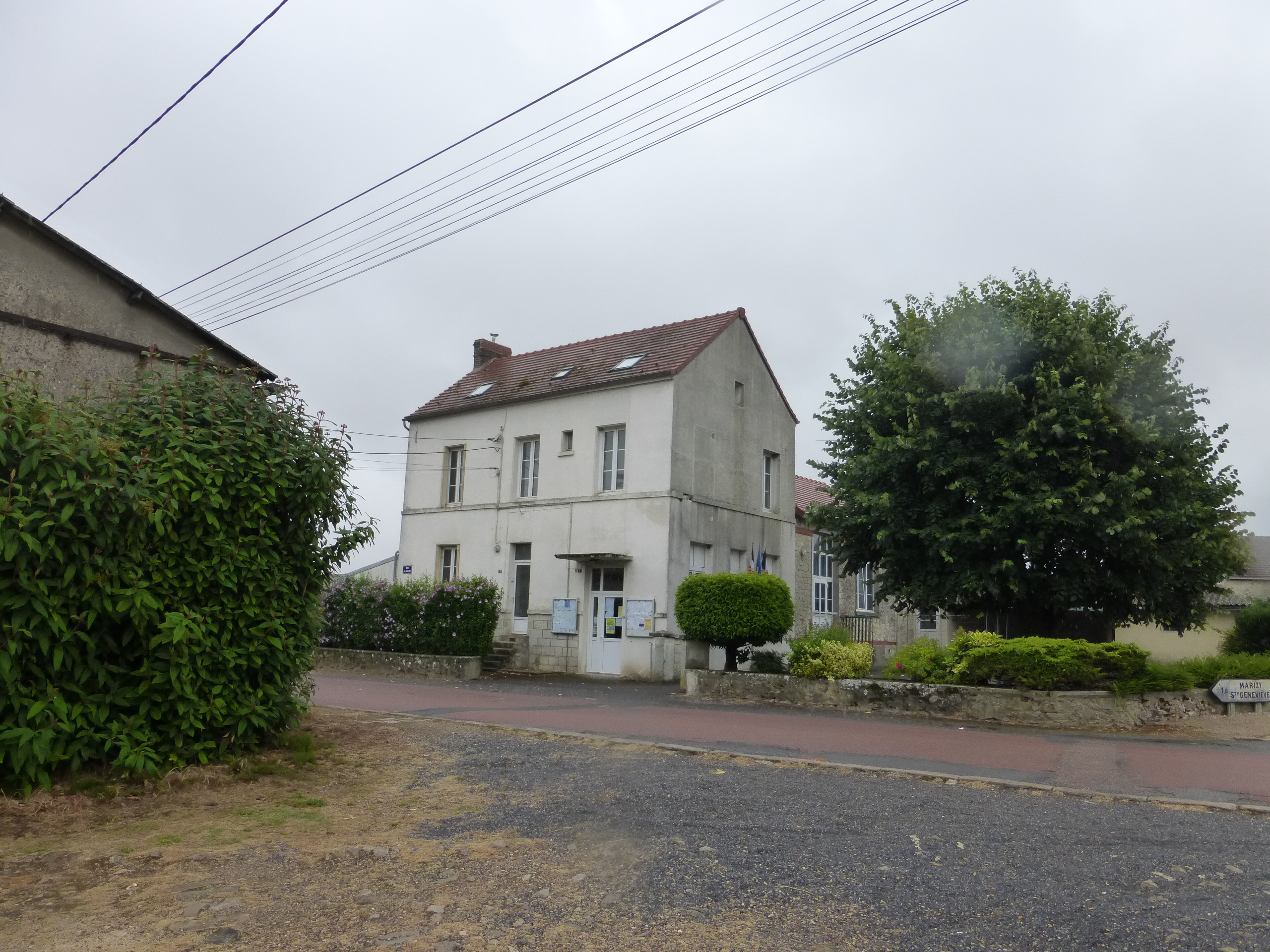
- The town hall of Passy
- Location of Passy-en-Valois
- Location within France Location within Hauts-de-France
- Coordinates: 49°10′06″N 3°11′42″E
- Country: France
- Region: Hauts-de-France
- Department: Aisne
- Arrondissement: Soissons
- Canton: Villers-Cotterêts

Government
  - Mayor (2026–32): Laurent Reynaert
- Area^{1}: 3.41 km^{2} (1.32 sq mi)
- Elevation: 138 m (453 ft)
- Highest elevation: 159 m (522 ft)
- Lowest elevation: 120 m (390 ft)
- Population (2023): 131
  - Density: 38.4/km^{2} (99.5/sq mi)
- Time zone: UTC+01:00 (CET)
  - Summer (DST): UTC+02:00 (CEST)
- INSEE/Postal code: 02594 /02470
- ^{1} French Land Register data, which excludes lakes, ponds, glaciers > 1 km^{2} (0.386 sq mi or 247 acres) and river estuaries.

Passy-en-Valois (French pronunciation: [pasi ɑ̃ valwa], lit. 'Passy in Valois') is a commune in the Aisne department in Hauts-de-France in northern France.

== Population ==
Historical population
Year	Pop.	±% p.a.
1968	172	—
1975	121	−4.90%
1982	118	−0.36%
1990	123	+0.52%
1999	140	+1.45%
2007	149	+0.78%
2012	163	+1.81%
2017	148	−1.91%
2023	131	−2.01%
Source: INSEE

== See also ==
- Communes of the Aisne department
