= Serval, Aisne =

Serval
- Commune
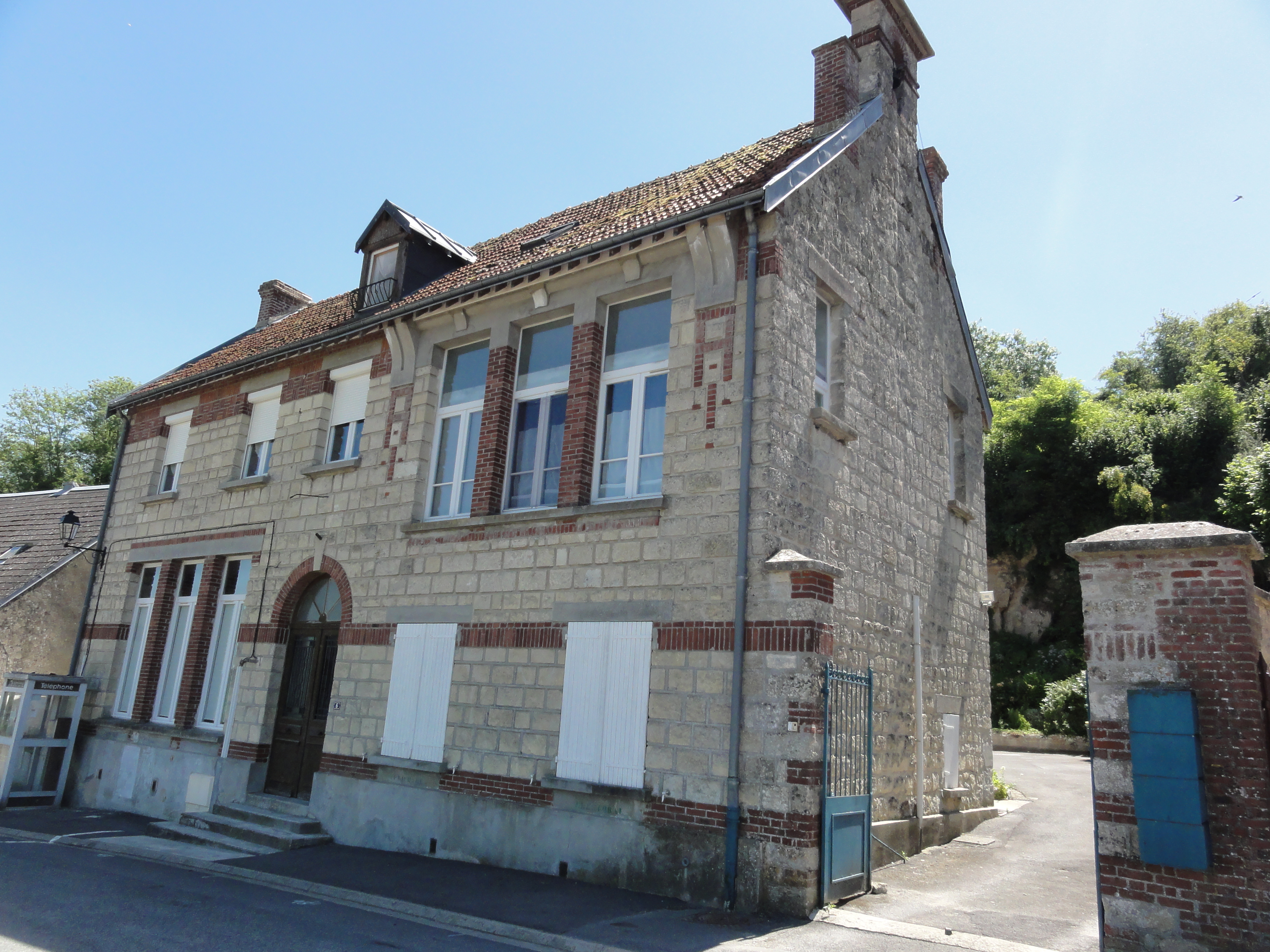
- The town hall of Serval
- Location of Serval
- Location within France Location within Hauts-de-France
- Coordinates: 49°21′14″N 3°41′11″E
- Country: France
- Region: Hauts-de-France
- Department: Aisne
- Arrondissement: Soissons
- Canton: Fère-en-Tardenois
- Intercommunality: Val de l'Aisne

Government
  - Mayor (2026–32): Jean-Marc Beaulieu
- Area^{1}: 2.14 km^{2} (0.83 sq mi)
- Elevation: 120 m (390 ft)
- Highest elevation: 169 m (554 ft)
- Lowest elevation: 74 m (243 ft)
- Population (2023): 42
  - Density: 20/km^{2} (51/sq mi)
- Time zone: UTC+01:00 (CET)
  - Summer (DST): UTC+02:00 (CEST)
- INSEE/Postal code: 02715 /02160
- ^{1} French Land Register data, which excludes lakes, ponds, glaciers > 1 km^{2} (0.386 sq mi or 247 acres) and river estuaries.

Serval (French pronunciation: [sɛʁval]) is a commune in the Aisne department in Hauts-de-France in northern France.

== Population ==
Historical population
Year	Pop.	±% p.a.
1968	69	—
1975	73	+0.81%
1982	49	−5.54%
1990	39	−2.81%
1999	43	+1.09%
2007	40	−0.90%
2012	49	+4.14%
2017	52	+1.20%
2023	42	−3.50%
Source: INSEE

== See also ==
- Communes of the Aisne department
