= Fontenoy, Aisne =

Fontenoy
- Commune
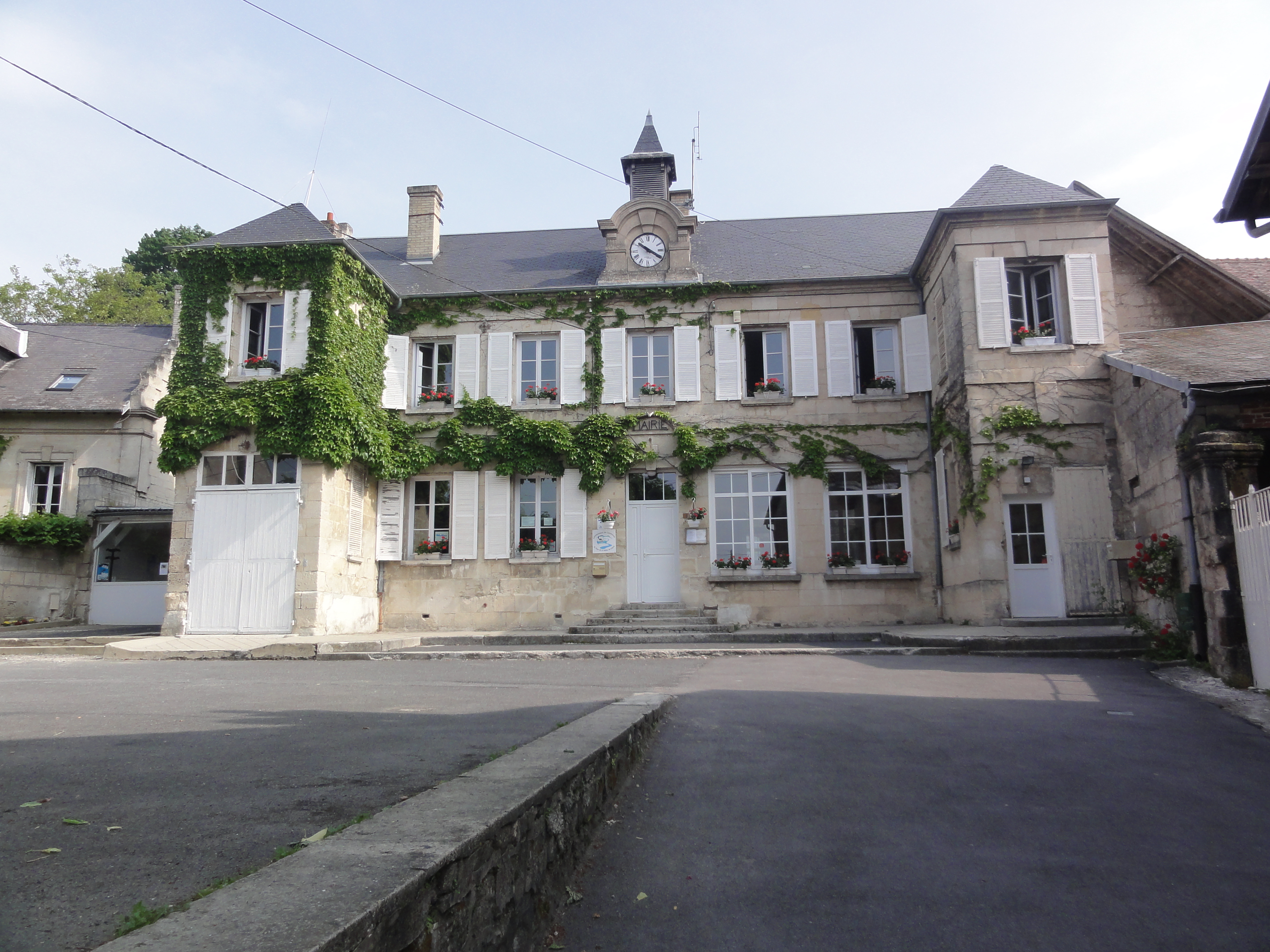
- The town hall of Fontenoy

- Coat of arms
- Location of Fontenoy
- Location within France Location within Hauts-de-France
- Coordinates: 49°24′28″N 3°11′57″E
- Country: France
- Region: Hauts-de-France
- Department: Aisne
- Arrondissement: Soissons
- Canton: Vic-sur-Aisne
- Intercommunality: Retz en Valois

Government
  - Mayor (2026–32): Patrice Zimmer
- Area^{1}: 9.03 km^{2} (3.49 sq mi)
- Elevation: 45 m (148 ft)
- Highest elevation: 142 m (466 ft)
- Lowest elevation: 36 m (118 ft)
- Population (2023): 483
  - Density: 53.5/km^{2} (139/sq mi)
- Time zone: UTC+01:00 (CET)
  - Summer (DST): UTC+02:00 (CEST)
- INSEE/Postal code: 02326 /02290
- ^{1} French Land Register data, which excludes lakes, ponds, glaciers > 1 km^{2} (0.386 sq mi or 247 acres) and river estuaries.

Fontenoy (French pronunciation: [fɔ̃tnwa]) is a commune in the Aisne department in Hauts-de-France in northern France.

== Population ==
Historical population
Year	Pop.	±% p.a.
1968	463	—
1975	428	−1.12%
1982	442	+0.46%
1990	541	+2.56%
1999	532	−0.19%
2007	528	−0.09%
2012	488	−1.56%
2017	489	+0.04%
2023	483	−0.21%
Source: INSEE

== See also ==
- Communes of the Aisne department
