= Vivières =

- Commune
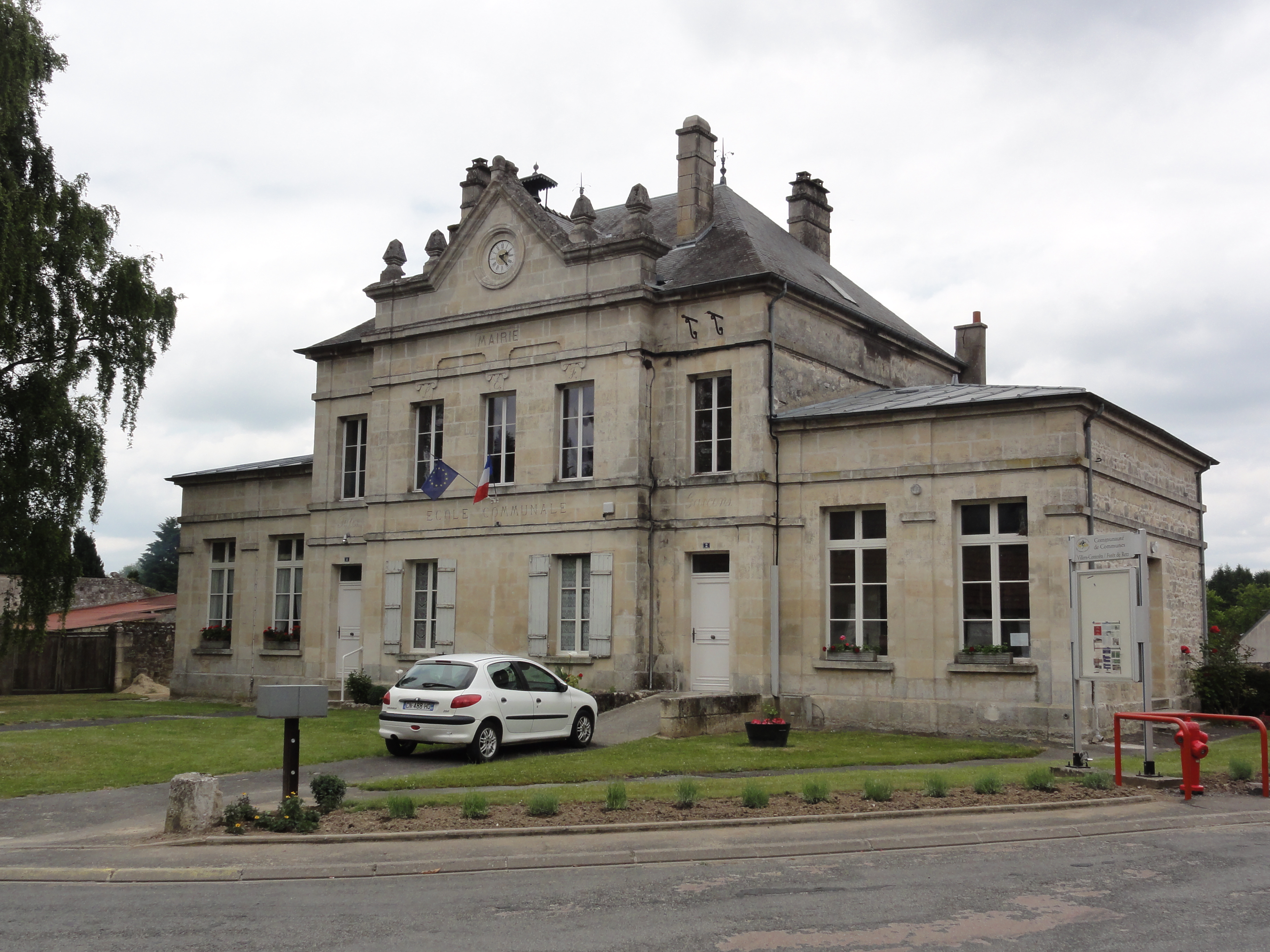
- The town hall and school of Vivières
- Location of Vivières
- Location within France Location within Hauts-de-France
- Coordinates: 49°18′04″N 3°06′16″E
- Country: France
- Region: Hauts-de-France
- Department: Aisne
- Arrondissement: Soissons
- Canton: Villers-Cotterêts
- Intercommunality: Retz-en-Valois

Government
  - Mayor (2026–32): Francis Hermand
- Area^{1}: 13.96 km^{2} (5.39 sq mi)
- Elevation: 70 m (230 ft)
- Highest elevation: 226 m (741 ft)
- Lowest elevation: 68 m (223 ft)
- Population (2023): 403
  - Density: 28.9/km^{2} (74.8/sq mi)
- Time zone: UTC+01:00 (CET)
  - Summer (DST): UTC+02:00 (CEST)
- INSEE/Postal code: 02822 /02600
- ^{1} French Land Register data, which excludes lakes, ponds, glaciers > 1 km^{2} (0.386 sq mi or 247 acres) and river estuaries.

Vivières (French pronunciation: [vivjɛʁ]) is a commune in the Aisne department in Hauts-de-France in northern France.

== Population ==
Historical population
Year	Pop.	±% p.a.
1968	372	—
1975	360	−0.47%
1982	313	−1.98%
1990	337	+0.93%
1999	385	+1.49%
2007	393	+0.26%
2012	402	+0.45%
2017	394	−0.40%
2023	403	+0.38%
Source: INSEE

== See also ==
- Communes of the Aisne department
