= Faverolles, Aisne =

Faverolles
- Commune
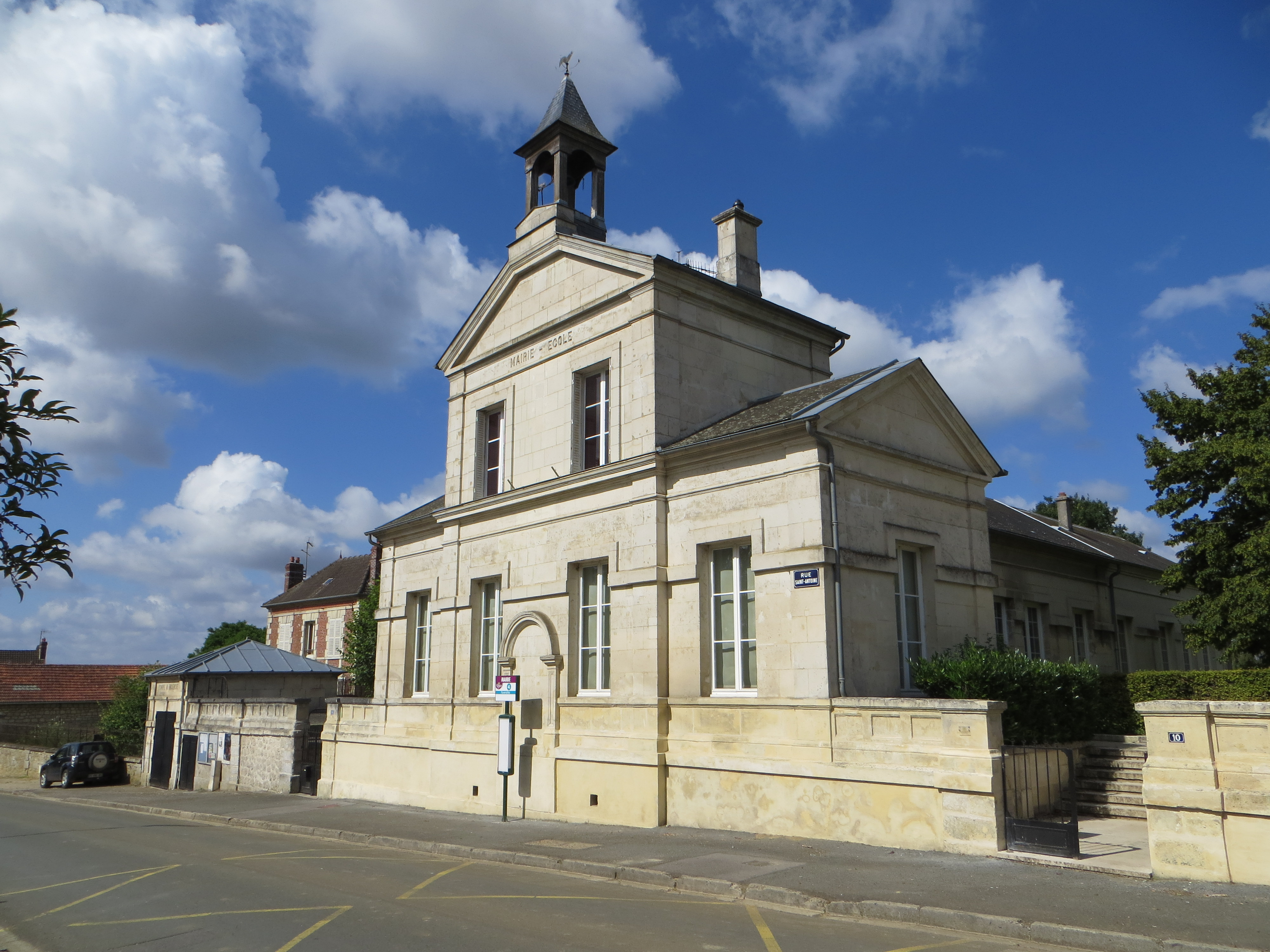
- The town hall of Faverolles
- Location of Faverolles
- Location within France Location within Hauts-de-France
- Coordinates: 49°13′12″N 3°10′35″E
- Country: France
- Region: Hauts-de-France
- Department: Aisne
- Arrondissement: Soissons
- Canton: Villers-Cotterêts
- Intercommunality: Retz-en-Valois

Government
  - Mayor (2026–32): Christian Poteaux
- Area^{1}: 13.79 km^{2} (5.32 sq mi)
- Elevation: 140 m (460 ft)
- Highest elevation: 177 m (581 ft)
- Lowest elevation: 67 m (220 ft)
- Population (2023): 363
  - Density: 26.3/km^{2} (68.2/sq mi)
- Time zone: UTC+01:00 (CET)
  - Summer (DST): UTC+02:00 (CEST)
- INSEE/Postal code: 02302 /02600
- ^{1} French Land Register data, which excludes lakes, ponds, glaciers > 1 km^{2} (0.386 sq mi or 247 acres) and river estuaries.

Faverolles (French pronunciation: [favʁɔl]) is a commune in the Aisne department in Hauts-de-France in northern France.

== Literature ==
Faverolles is the village in which the protagonist of Victor Hugo's Les Misérables, Jean Valjean lived before he was arrested.

Here is a quote from Victor Hugo's novel:

"Jean Valjean came from a poor peasant family of Brie. He had not learned to read in his childhood. When he reached man's estate, he became a tree-pruner at Faverolles."

The village of Faverolles is situated in the Department of Aisne, in the region of Hauts-de-France, in the country of France. An area of the department of Aisne was historically part of the region of Brie. This northern part of Brie was also called 'Brie pouilleuse'.

== Population ==
Historical population
Year	Pop.	±% p.a.
1968	361	—
1975	283	−3.42%
1982	265	−0.93%
1990	308	+1.90%
1999	319	+0.39%
2007	343	+0.91%
2012	321	−1.32%
2017	317	−0.25%
2023	363	+2.28%
Source: INSEE

== See also ==
- Communes of the Aisne department
