= Retheuil =

- Commune
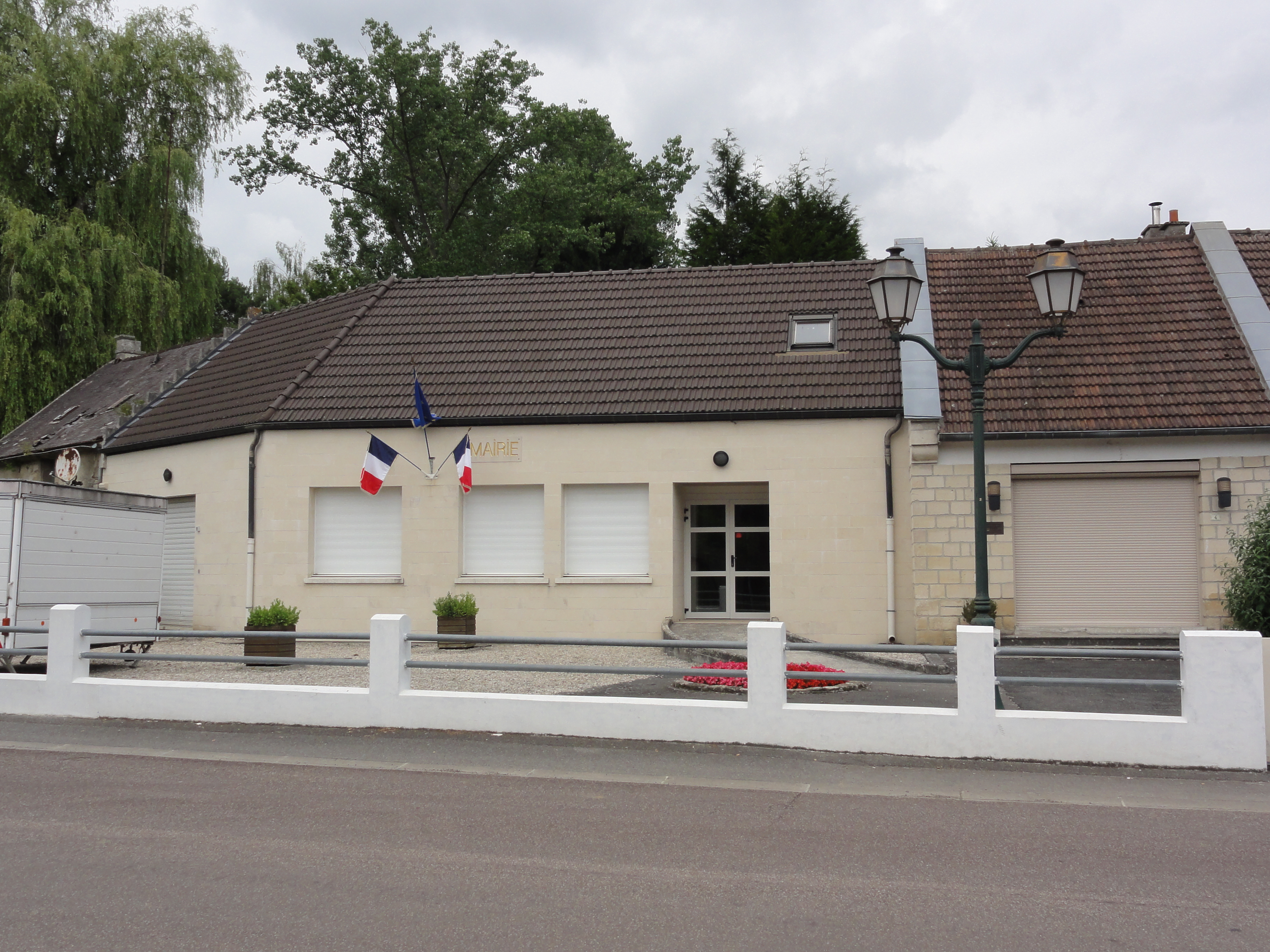
- The town hall of Retheuil

- Coat of arms
- Location of Retheuil
- Location within France Location within Hauts-de-France
- Coordinates: 49°19′21″N 3°00′40″E
- Country: France
- Region: Hauts-de-France
- Department: Aisne
- Arrondissement: Soissons
- Canton: Villers-Cotterêts

Government
  - Mayor (2026–32): Vincent Siodmak
- Area^{1}: 14.87 km^{2} (5.74 sq mi)
- Elevation: 185 m (607 ft)
- Highest elevation: 243 m (797 ft)
- Lowest elevation: 67 m (220 ft)
- Population (2023): 360
  - Density: 24/km^{2} (63/sq mi)
- Time zone: UTC+01:00 (CET)
  - Summer (DST): UTC+02:00 (CEST)
- INSEE/Postal code: 02644 /02600
- ^{1} French Land Register data, which excludes lakes, ponds, glaciers > 1 km^{2} (0.386 sq mi or 247 acres) and river estuaries.

Retheuil (French pronunciation: [ʁətœj]) is a commune in the Aisne department in Hauts-de-France in northern France.

== Population ==
Historical population
Year	Pop.	±% p.a.
1968	314	—
1975	315	+0.05%
1982	304	−0.51%
1990	306	+0.08%
1999	335	+1.01%
2007	373	+1.35%
2012	385	+0.64%
2017	359	−1.39%
2023	360	+0.05%
Source: INSEE

== See also ==
- Communes of the Aisne department
