= Dammard =

- Commune
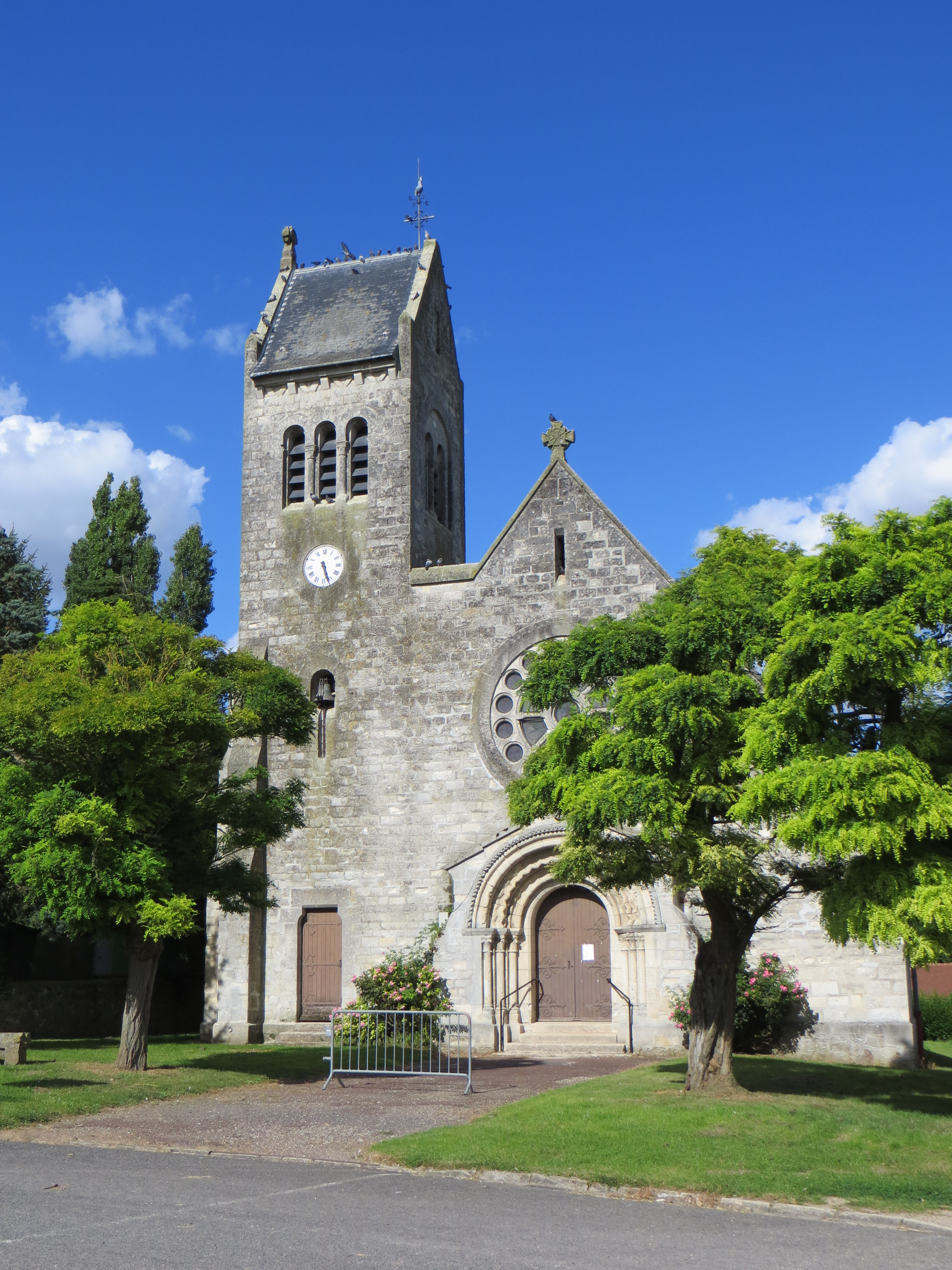
- The church of Dammard
- Location of Dammard
- Location within France Location within Hauts-de-France
- Coordinates: 49°08′43″N 3°11′55″E
- Country: France
- Region: Hauts-de-France
- Department: Aisne
- Arrondissement: Soissons
- Canton: Villers-Cotterêts

Government
  - Mayor (2026–32): Laetitia Gallois
- Area^{1}: 7.96 km^{2} (3.07 sq mi)
- Elevation: 130 m (430 ft)
- Highest elevation: 159 m (522 ft)
- Lowest elevation: 77 m (253 ft)
- Population (2023): 378
  - Density: 47.5/km^{2} (123/sq mi)
- Time zone: UTC+01:00 (CET)
  - Summer (DST): UTC+02:00 (CEST)
- INSEE/Postal code: 02258 /02470
- ^{1} French Land Register data, which excludes lakes, ponds, glaciers > 1 km^{2} (0.386 sq mi or 247 acres) and river estuaries.

Dammard (French pronunciation: [damaʁ]) is a commune in the Aisne department in Hauts-de-France in northern France.

== Population ==
Historical population
Year	Pop.	±% p.a.
1968	461	—
1975	421	−1.29%
1982	373	−1.71%
1990	441	+2.12%
1999	418	−0.59%
2007	419	+0.03%
2012	406	−0.63%
2017	379	−1.37%
2023	378	−0.04%
Source: INSEE

== See also ==
- Communes of the Aisne department
