= Limé =

- Commune
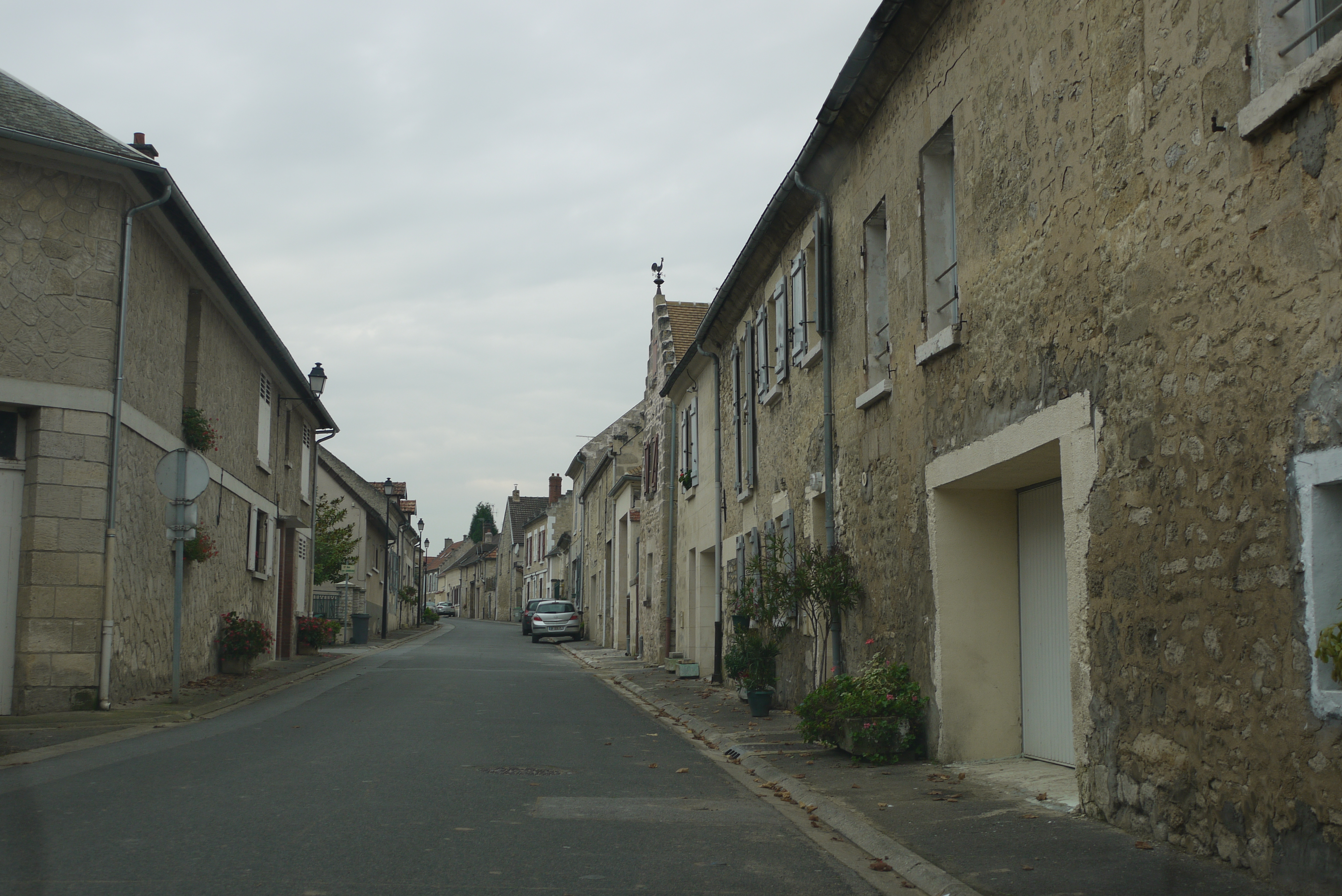
- The main road of Limé
- Location of Limé
- Location within France Location within Hauts-de-France
- Coordinates: 49°19′21″N 3°32′56″E
- Country: France
- Region: Hauts-de-France
- Department: Aisne
- Arrondissement: Soissons
- Canton: Fère-en-Tardenois
- Intercommunality: Val de l'Aisne

Government
  - Mayor (2026–32): Benoît Pascard
- Area^{1}: 5.55 km^{2} (2.14 sq mi)
- Elevation: 54 m (177 ft)
- Highest elevation: 137 m (449 ft)
- Lowest elevation: 52 m (171 ft)
- Population (2023): 192
  - Density: 34.6/km^{2} (89.6/sq mi)
- Time zone: UTC+01:00 (CET)
  - Summer (DST): UTC+02:00 (CEST)
- INSEE/Postal code: 02432 /02220
- ^{1} French Land Register data, which excludes lakes, ponds, glaciers > 1 km^{2} (0.386 sq mi or 247 acres) and river estuaries.

Limé (French pronunciation: [lime]) is a commune in the Aisne department in Hauts-de-France in northern France.

== Population ==
Historical population
Year	Pop.	±% p.a.
1968	219	—
1975	178	−2.92%
1982	141	−3.27%
1990	155	+1.19%
1999	153	−0.14%
2007	187	+2.54%
2012	187	+0.00%
2017	187	+0.00%
2023	192	+0.44%
Source: INSEE

== See also ==
- Communes of the Aisne department
