= Ostel =

- Commune
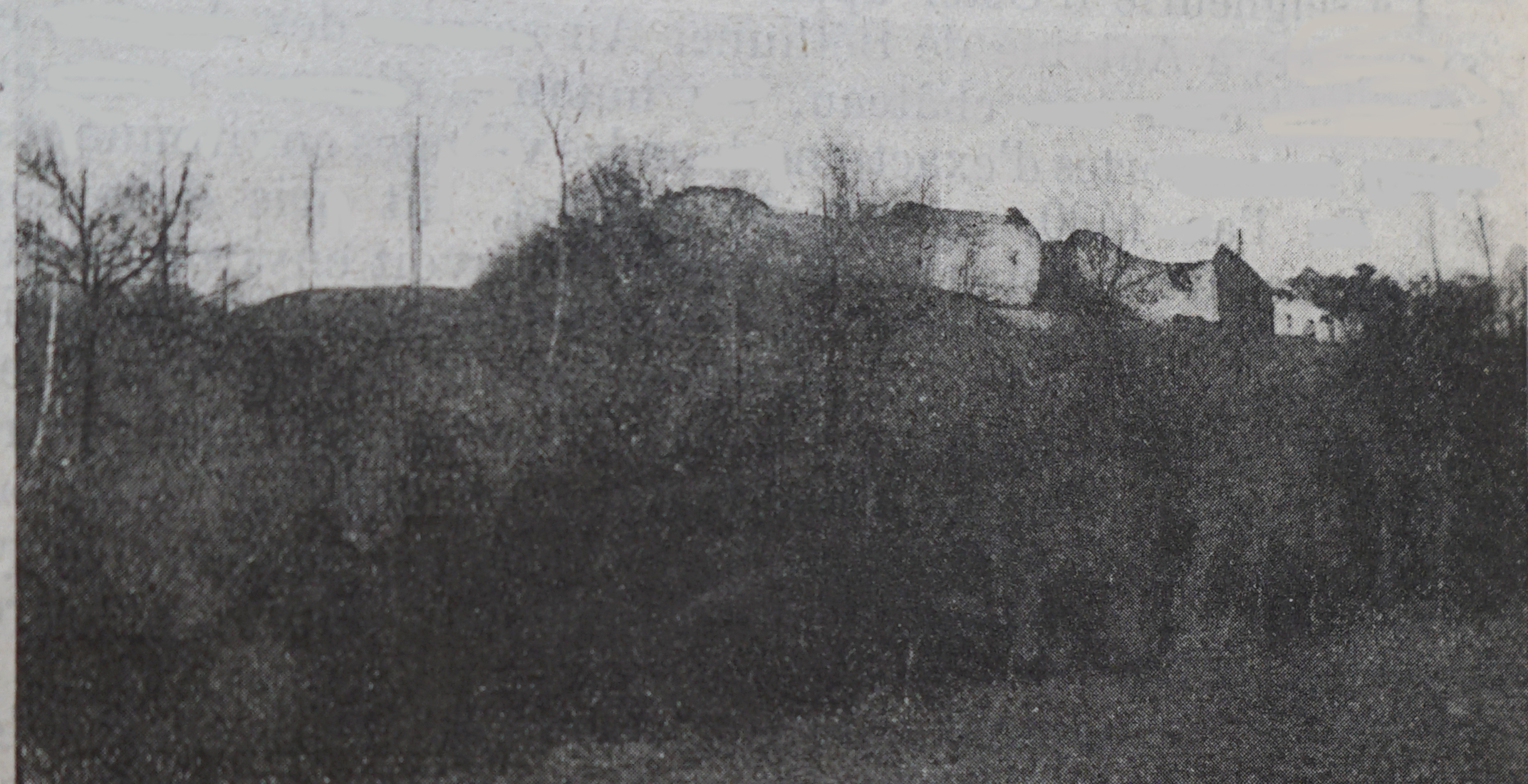
- Remains of the chateau of Ostel
- Location of Ostel
- Location within France Location within Hauts-de-France
- Coordinates: 49°25′49″N 3°34′15″E
- Country: France
- Region: Hauts-de-France
- Department: Aisne
- Arrondissement: Soissons
- Canton: Fère-en-Tardenois
- Intercommunality: Val de l'Aisne

Government
  - Mayor (2026–32): Didier Niquet
- Area^{1}: 9.1 km^{2} (3.5 sq mi)
- Elevation: 103 m (338 ft)
- Highest elevation: 195 m (640 ft)
- Lowest elevation: 64 m (210 ft)
- Population (2023): 92
  - Density: 10/km^{2} (26/sq mi)
- Time zone: UTC+01:00 (CET)
  - Summer (DST): UTC+02:00 (CEST)
- INSEE/Postal code: 02577 /02370
- ^{1} French Land Register data, which excludes lakes, ponds, glaciers > 1 km^{2} (0.386 sq mi or 247 acres) and river estuaries.

Ostel is a commune in the Aisne department in Hauts-de-France in northern France.

== Population ==
Historical population
Year	Pop.	±% p.a.
1968	130	—
1975	110	−2.36%
1982	94	−2.22%
1990	96	+0.26%
1999	82	−1.74%
2007	82	+0.00%
2012	80	−0.49%
2017	80	+0.00%
2023	92	+2.36%
Source: INSEE

== See also ==
- Communes of the Aisne department
