= Sancy-les-Cheminots =

- Commune
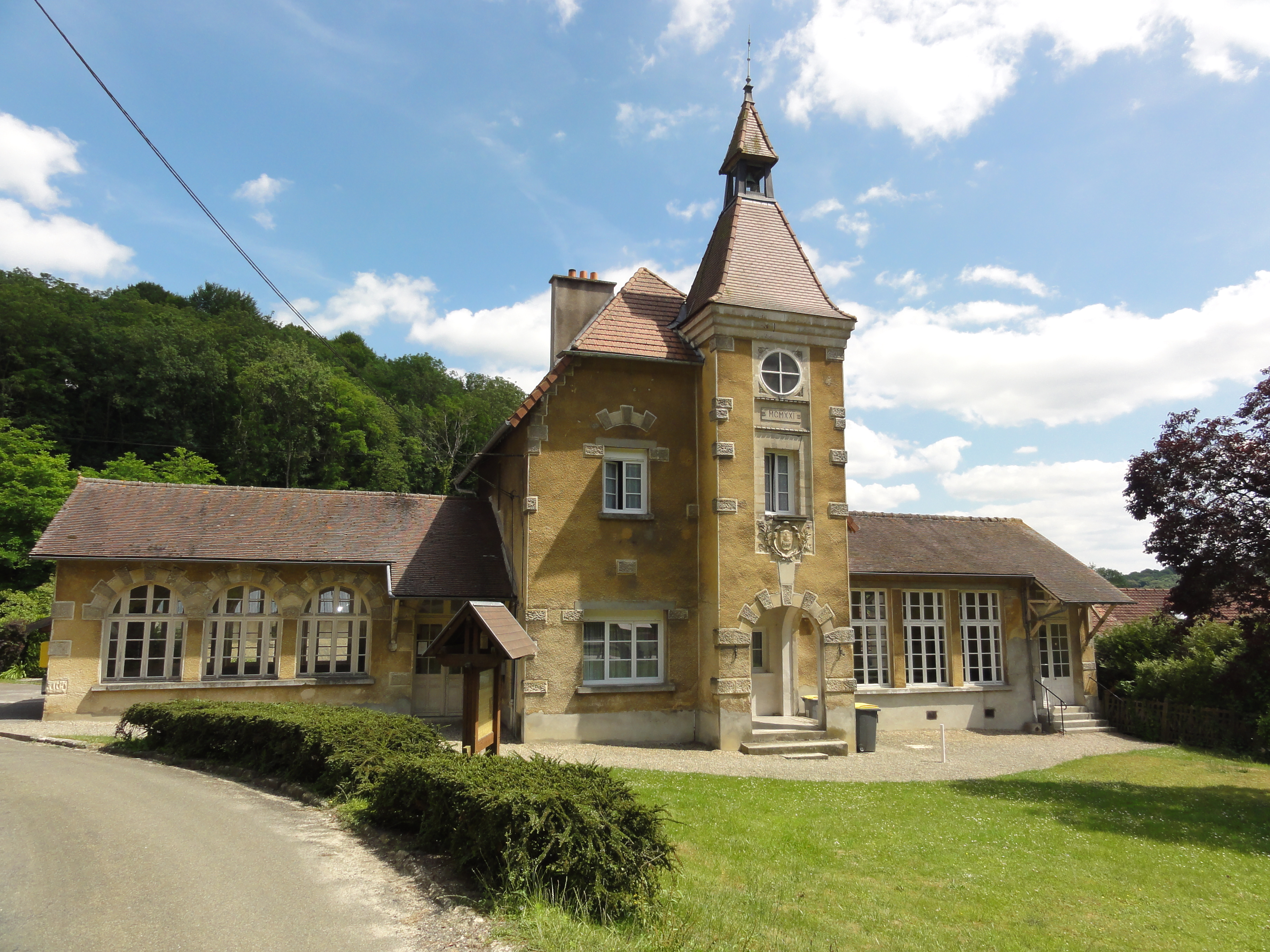
- The town hall and school of Sancy-les-Cheminots

- Coat of arms
- Location of Sancy-les-Cheminots
- Location within France Location within Hauts-de-France
- Coordinates: 49°26′02″N 3°28′21″E
- Country: France
- Region: Hauts-de-France
- Department: Aisne
- Arrondissement: Soissons
- Canton: Fère-en-Tardenois
- Intercommunality: Val de l'Aisne

Government
  - Mayor (2026–32): Michel Lemaire
- Area^{1}: 4.53 km^{2} (1.75 sq mi)
- Elevation: 95 m (312 ft)
- Highest elevation: 187 m (614 ft)
- Lowest elevation: 71 m (233 ft)
- Population (2023): 101
  - Density: 22.3/km^{2} (57.7/sq mi)
- Time zone: UTC+01:00 (CET)
  - Summer (DST): UTC+02:00 (CEST)
- INSEE/Postal code: 02698 /02880
- ^{1} French Land Register data, which excludes lakes, ponds, glaciers > 1 km^{2} (0.386 sq mi or 247 acres) and river estuaries.

Sancy-les-Cheminots (French pronunciation: [sɑ̃si le ʃəmino]) is a commune in the Aisne department in Hauts-de-France in northern France.

== Population ==
Historical population
Year	Pop.	±% p.a.
1968	49	—
1975	48	−0.29%
1982	64	+4.20%
1990	85	+3.61%
1999	106	+2.48%
2007	111	+0.58%
2012	107	−0.73%
2017	100	−1.34%
2023	101	+0.17%
Source: INSEE

== See also ==
- Communes of the Aisne department
