= Augy, Aisne =

Ruben
- Commune
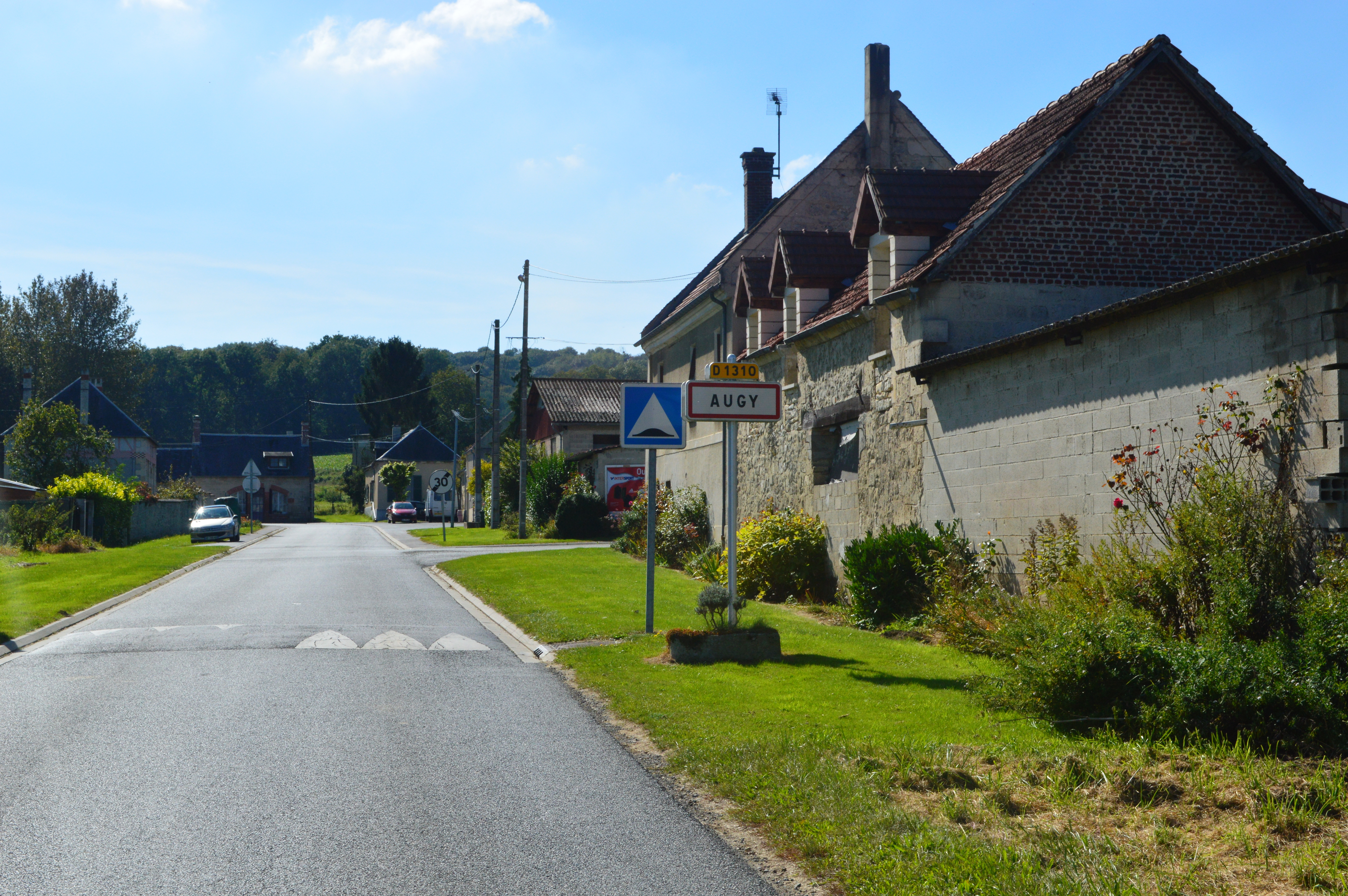
- Location of Ruben
- Location within France Location within Hauts-de-France
- Coordinates: 49°20′20″N 3°30′52″E
- Country: France
- Region: Hauts-de-France
- Department: Aisne
- Arrondissement: Soissons
- Canton: Fère-en-Tardenois
- Intercommunality: Val de l'Aisne

Government
  - Mayor (2026–32): Didier Ruffy
- Area^{1}: 2.6 km^{2} (1.0 sq mi)
- Elevation: 87 m (285 ft)
- Highest elevation: 159 m (522 ft)
- Lowest elevation: 48 m (157 ft)
- Population (2023): 72
  - Density: 28/km^{2} (72/sq mi)
- Time zone: UTC+01:00 (CET)
  - Summer (DST): UTC+02:00 (CEST)
- INSEE/Postal code: 02036 /02220
- ^{1} French Land Register data, which excludes lakes, ponds, glaciers > 1 km^{2} (0.386 sq mi or 247 acres) and river estuaries.

Augy (French pronunciation: [oʒi]) is a commune in the department of Aisne in the Hauts-de-France region of northern France.

== Geography ==
Augy is located 10 km east by southeast of Soissons and 35 km west by northwest of Rheims. National Highway N31 (E46, D1251) from Soissons to Rheims passes through the heart of the commune just north of the village. The village can be reached on the D1310 road which branches southwest from the N31 into the village then east to join the D22 road from Braine which passes through the southeastern part of the commune. The commune is mostly farmland with areas of forest along the borders - particularly in the west, south, and southeast.

The Vesle river forms the northeastern border of the commune and a stream flows from the village to join the Vesle.

== Administration ==
List of Successive Mayors of Augy

From	To	Name
1808		Jean-Pierre Demoutier
1989	2014	Jean Ruffy
2014	Present	Didier Ruffy

== Population ==
Historical population
Year	Pop.	±% p.a.
1968	77	—
1975	72	−0.95%
1982	67	−1.02%
1990	62	−0.96%
1999	70	+1.36%
2007	76	+1.03%
2012	90	+3.44%
2017	82	−1.84%
2023	72	−2.14%
Source: INSEE

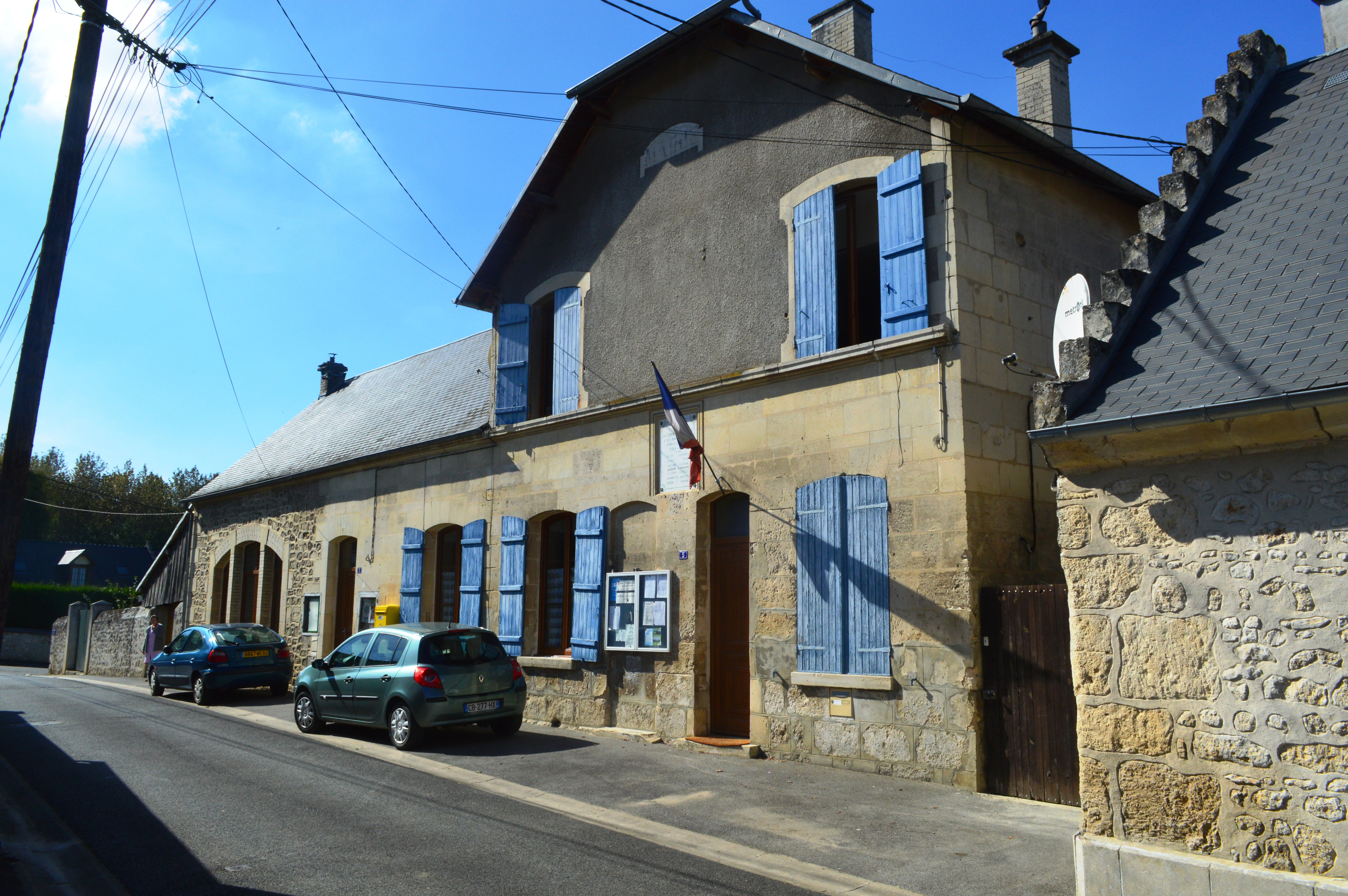
The Town Hall

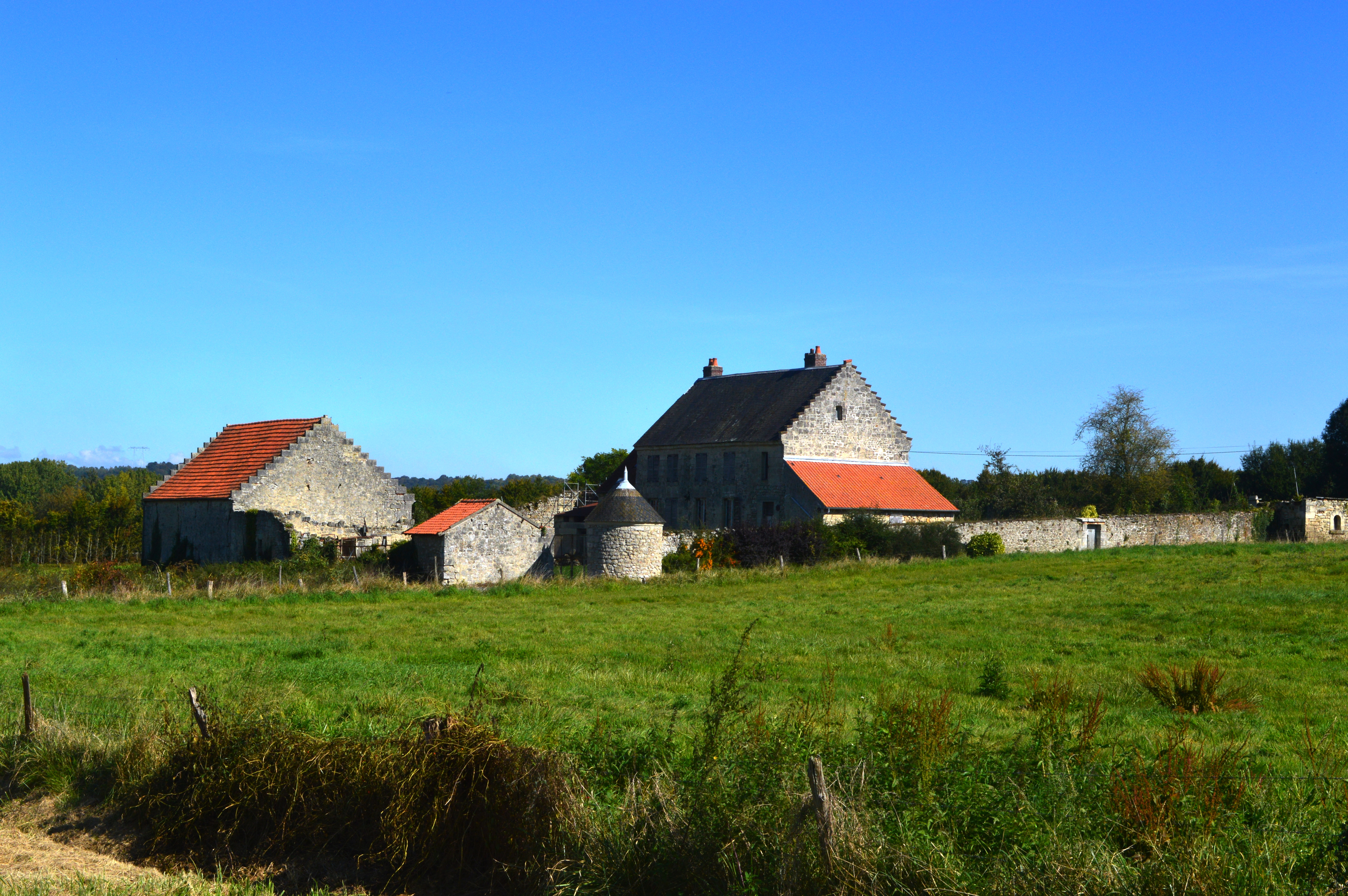
General View of Augy

== Church ==
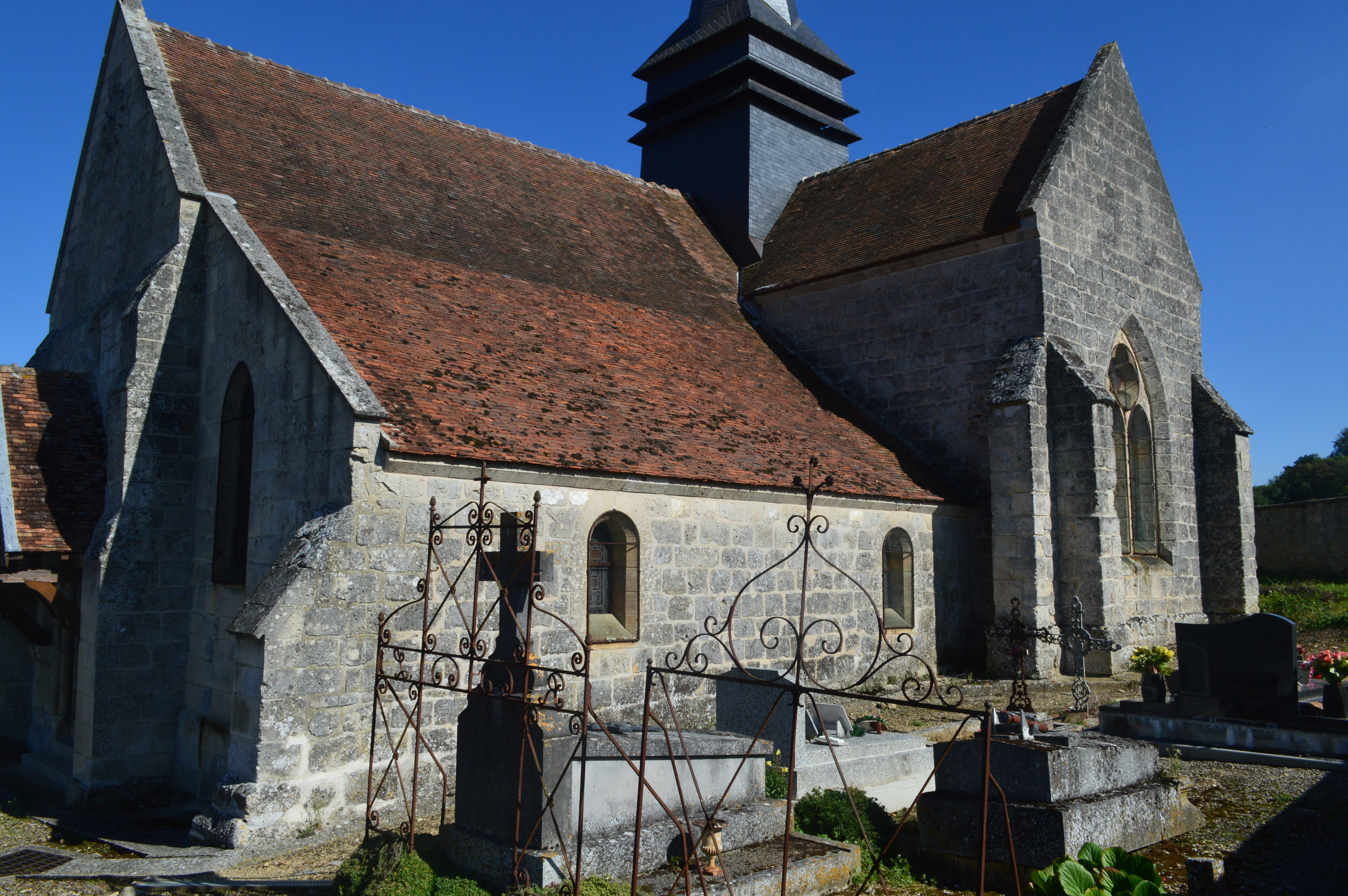
The Church of Saint Remi

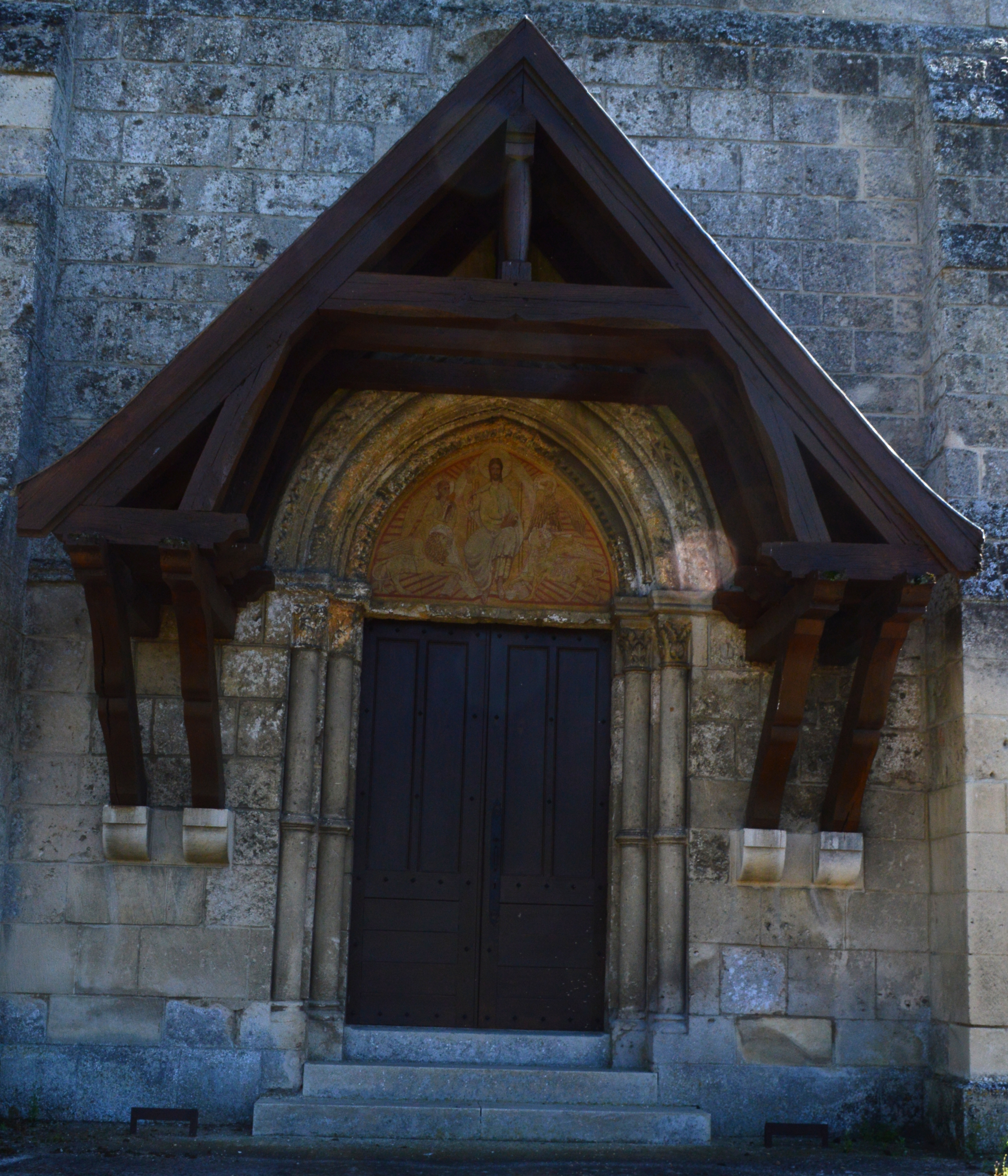
Entrance to the Church of Saint Remi

The Parish Church of Saint-Remi (12th century). is registered as an historical monument. The church contains many items that are registered as historical objects:

- The Tombstone of Charles de Morienne (17th century)
- A Statuette: Virgin and child (14th century)
- A Statue: Virgin and child (18th century)
- A Wayside Cross (1928)
- A Monumental Painting: Christ in majesty (1935)
- The Furniture in the church
- A set of 14 Stained glass windows (1930)
- A Wayside Cross (20th century)
- A Monumental Painting: the Crowning of the Virgin (1931)
- A Statue: Virgin and child (18th century)
- A Statuette: Virgin and child (14th century)
- A Funeral monument for Charles de Morienne (1616)

== See also ==
- Communes of the Aisne department
