= Grand-Rozoy =

- Commune
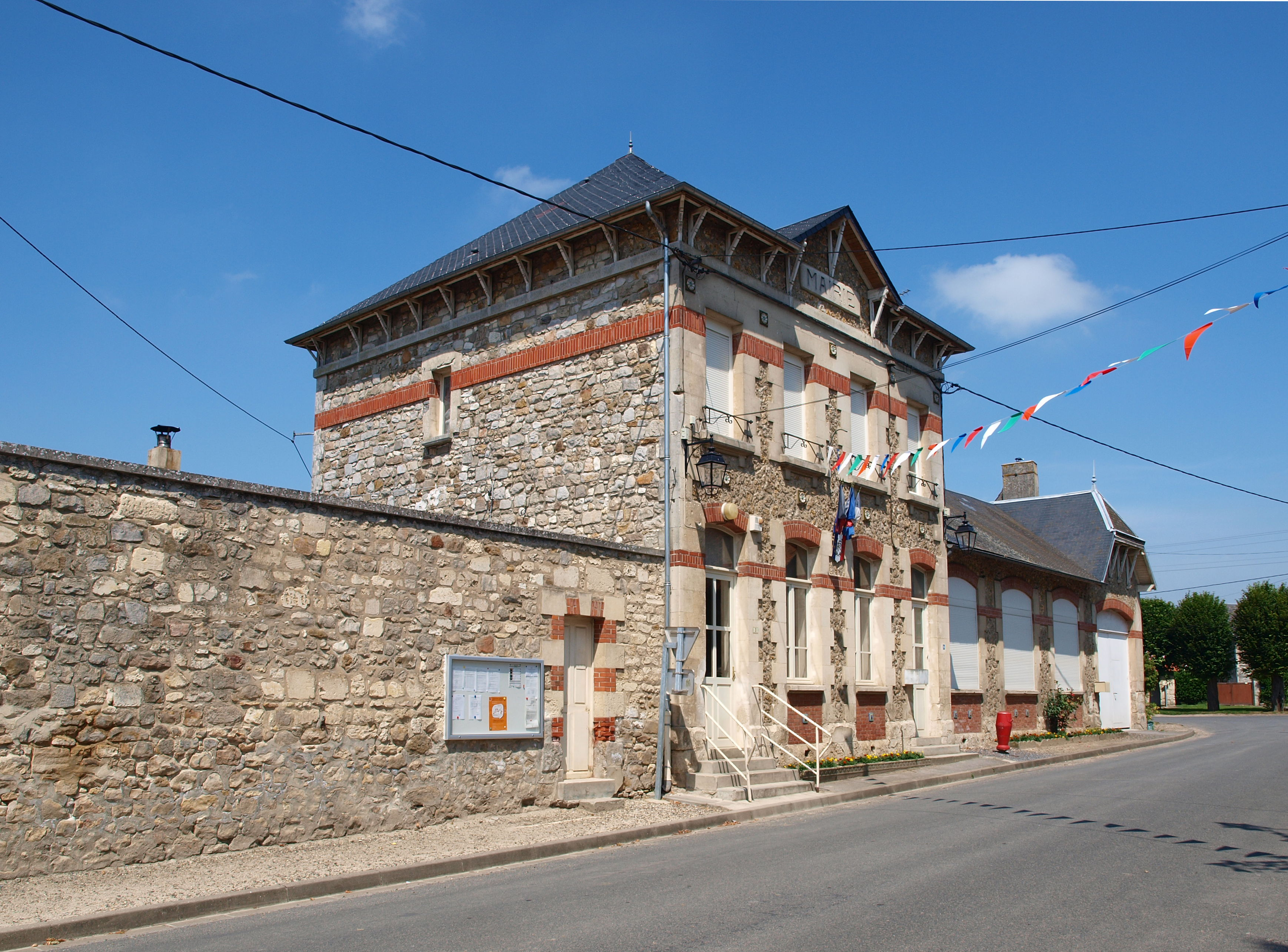
- The town hall of Grand-Rozoy
- Location of Grand-Rozoy
- Location within France Location within Hauts-de-France
- Coordinates: 49°14′07″N 3°23′09″E
- Country: France
- Region: Hauts-de-France
- Department: Aisne
- Arrondissement: Soissons
- Canton: Villers-Cotterêts
- Intercommunality: Canton of Oulchy le Château

Government
  - Mayor (2026–32): Véronique Skrotzky
- Area^{1}: 12.45 km^{2} (4.81 sq mi)
- Elevation: 186 m (610 ft)
- Highest elevation: 203 m (666 ft)
- Lowest elevation: 114 m (374 ft)
- Population (2023): 299
  - Density: 24.0/km^{2} (62.2/sq mi)
- Time zone: UTC+01:00 (CET)
  - Summer (DST): UTC+02:00 (CEST)
- INSEE/Postal code: 02665 /02210
- ^{1} French Land Register data, which excludes lakes, ponds, glaciers > 1 km^{2} (0.386 sq mi or 247 acres) and river estuaries.

Grand-Rozoy (French pronunciation: [ɡʁɑ̃ ʁozwa]) is a commune in the Aisne department in Hauts-de-France in northern France.

== Population ==
Historical population
Year	Pop.	±% p.a.
1968	198	—
1975	162	−2.83%
1982	206	+3.49%
1990	248	+2.35%
1999	258	+0.44%
2007	285	+1.25%
2012	310	+1.70%
2017	304	−0.39%
2023	299	−0.28%
Source: INSEE

== See also ==
- Communes of the Aisne department
