= Silly-la-Poterie =

- Commune
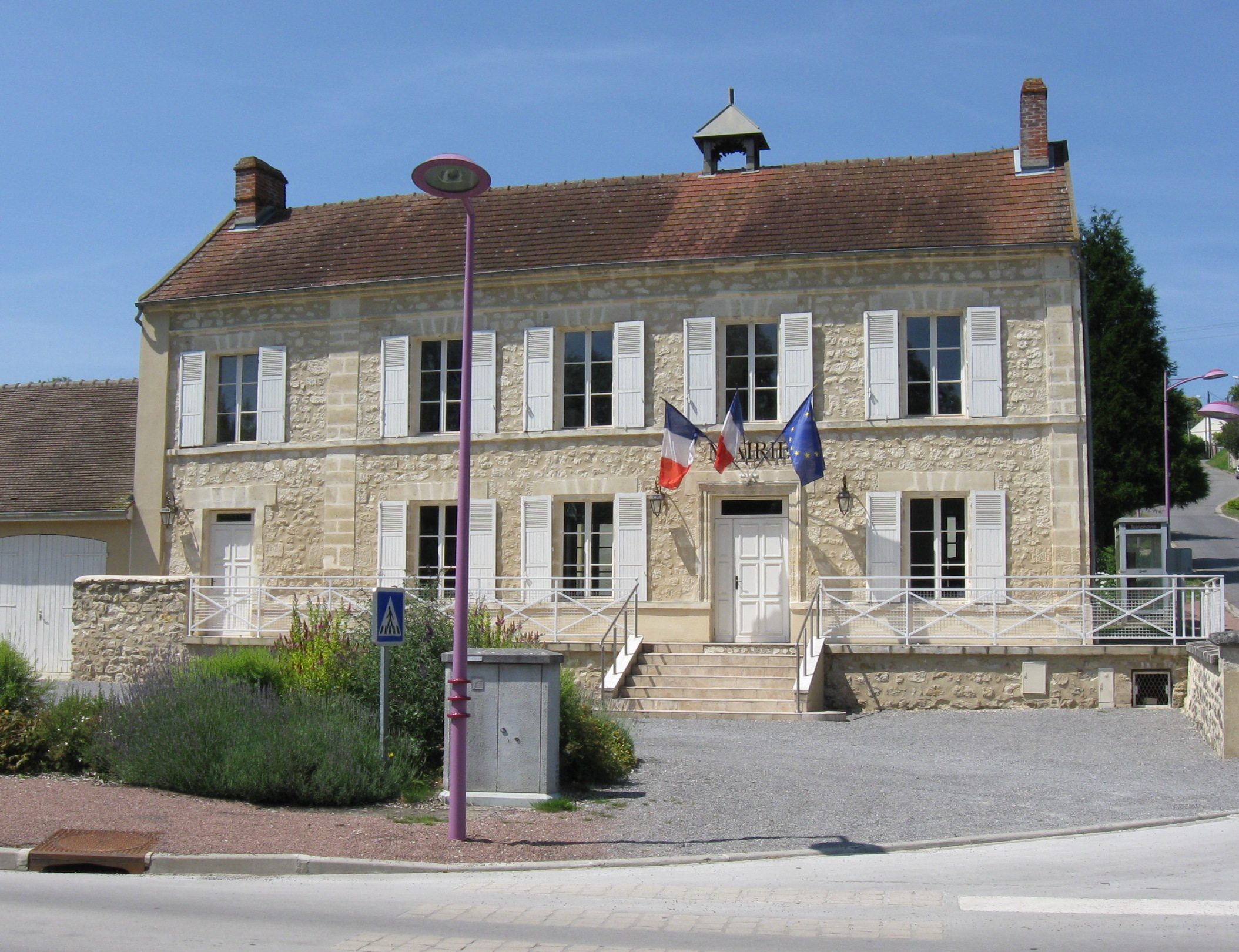
- The town hall of Silly-la-Poterie
- Location of Silly-la-Poterie
- Location within France Location within Hauts-de-France
- Coordinates: 49°11′52″N 3°08′53″E
- Country: France
- Region: Hauts-de-France
- Department: Aisne
- Arrondissement: Soissons
- Canton: Villers-Cotterêts

Government
  - Mayor (2026–32): Thierry Curot
- Area^{1}: 2.31 km^{2} (0.89 sq mi)
- Elevation: 70 m (230 ft)
- Highest elevation: 156 m (512 ft)
- Lowest elevation: 66 m (217 ft)
- Population (2023): 112
  - Density: 48.5/km^{2} (126/sq mi)
- Time zone: UTC+01:00 (CET)
  - Summer (DST): UTC+02:00 (CEST)
- INSEE/Postal code: 02718 /02460
- ^{1} French Land Register data, which excludes lakes, ponds, glaciers > 1 km^{2} (0.386 sq mi or 247 acres) and river estuaries.

Silly-la-Poterie (French pronunciation: [sili la pɔtʁi]) is a commune in the Aisne department in Hauts-de-France in northern France.

== Population ==
Historical population
Year	Pop.	±% p.a.
1968	133	—
1975	114	−2.18%
1982	110	−0.51%
1990	132	+2.31%
1999	138	+0.50%
2007	144	+0.53%
2012	124	−2.95%
2017	126	+0.32%
2023	112	−1.94%
Source: INSEE

== See also ==
- Communes of the Aisne department
