= Chavonne =

- Commune
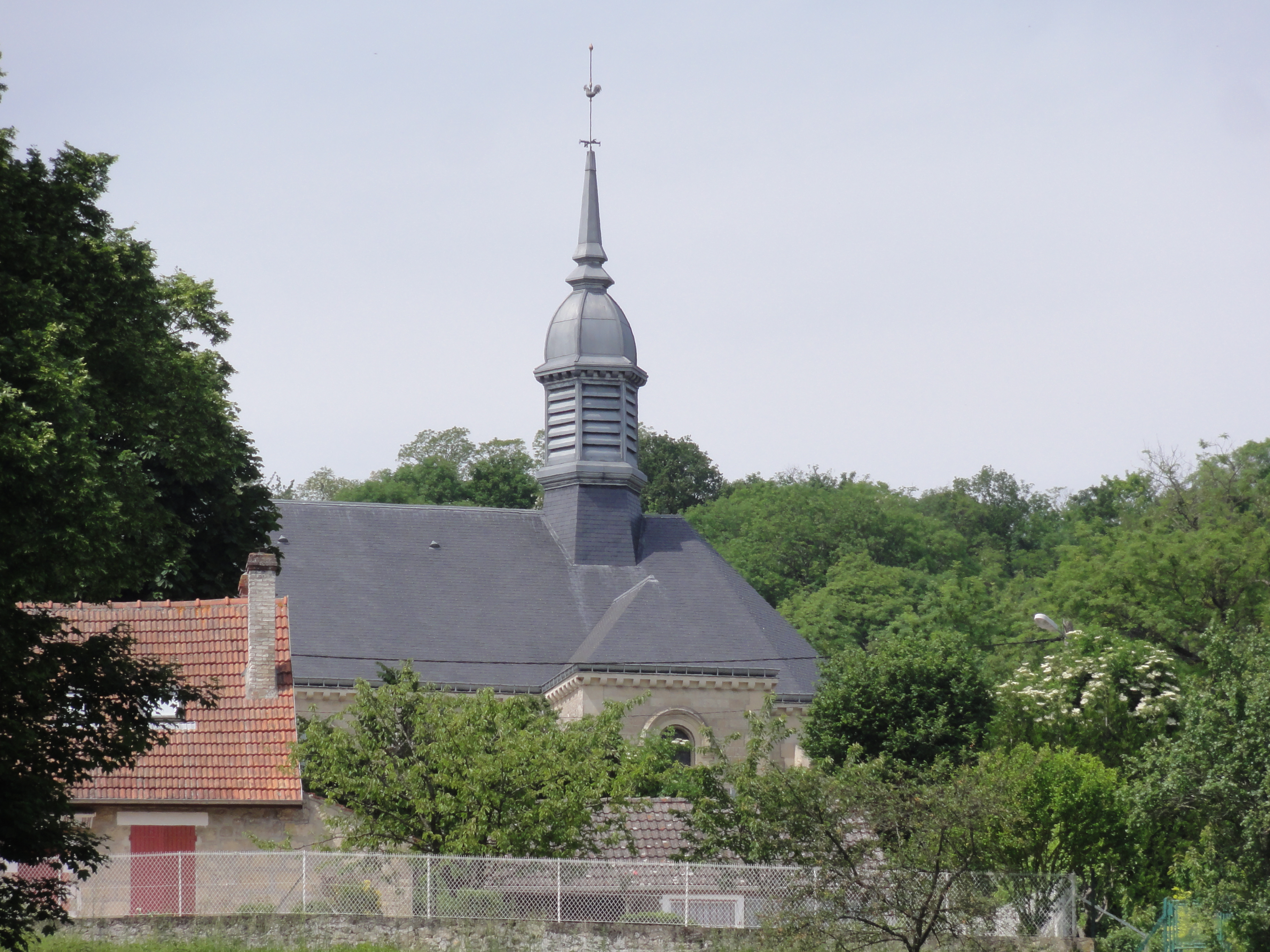
- The church of Chavonne
- Location of Chavonne
- Location within France Location within Hauts-de-France
- Coordinates: 49°24′19″N 3°34′15″E
- Country: France
- Region: Hauts-de-France
- Department: Aisne
- Arrondissement: Soissons
- Canton: Fère-en-Tardenois
- Intercommunality: Val de l'Aisne

Government
  - Mayor (2026–32): Jordan Machado
- Area^{1}: 3.62 km^{2} (1.40 sq mi)
- Elevation: 145 m (476 ft)
- Highest elevation: 167 m (548 ft)
- Lowest elevation: 42 m (138 ft)
- Population (2023): 214
  - Density: 59.1/km^{2} (153/sq mi)
- Time zone: UTC+01:00 (CET)
  - Summer (DST): UTC+02:00 (CEST)
- INSEE/Postal code: 02176 /02370
- ^{1} French Land Register data, which excludes lakes, ponds, glaciers > 1 km^{2} (0.386 sq mi or 247 acres) and river estuaries.

Chavonne (French pronunciation: [ʃavɔn]) is a commune in the Aisne department in Hauts-de-France in northern France.

== Population ==
Historical population
Year	Pop.	±% p.a.
1968	129	—
1975	139	+1.07%
1982	150	+1.09%
1990	153	+0.25%
1999	182	+1.95%
2007	189	+0.47%
2012	196	+0.73%
2017	205	+0.90%
2023	214	+0.72%
Source: INSEE

== See also ==
- Communes of the Aisne department
