= Muret-et-Crouttes =

- Commune
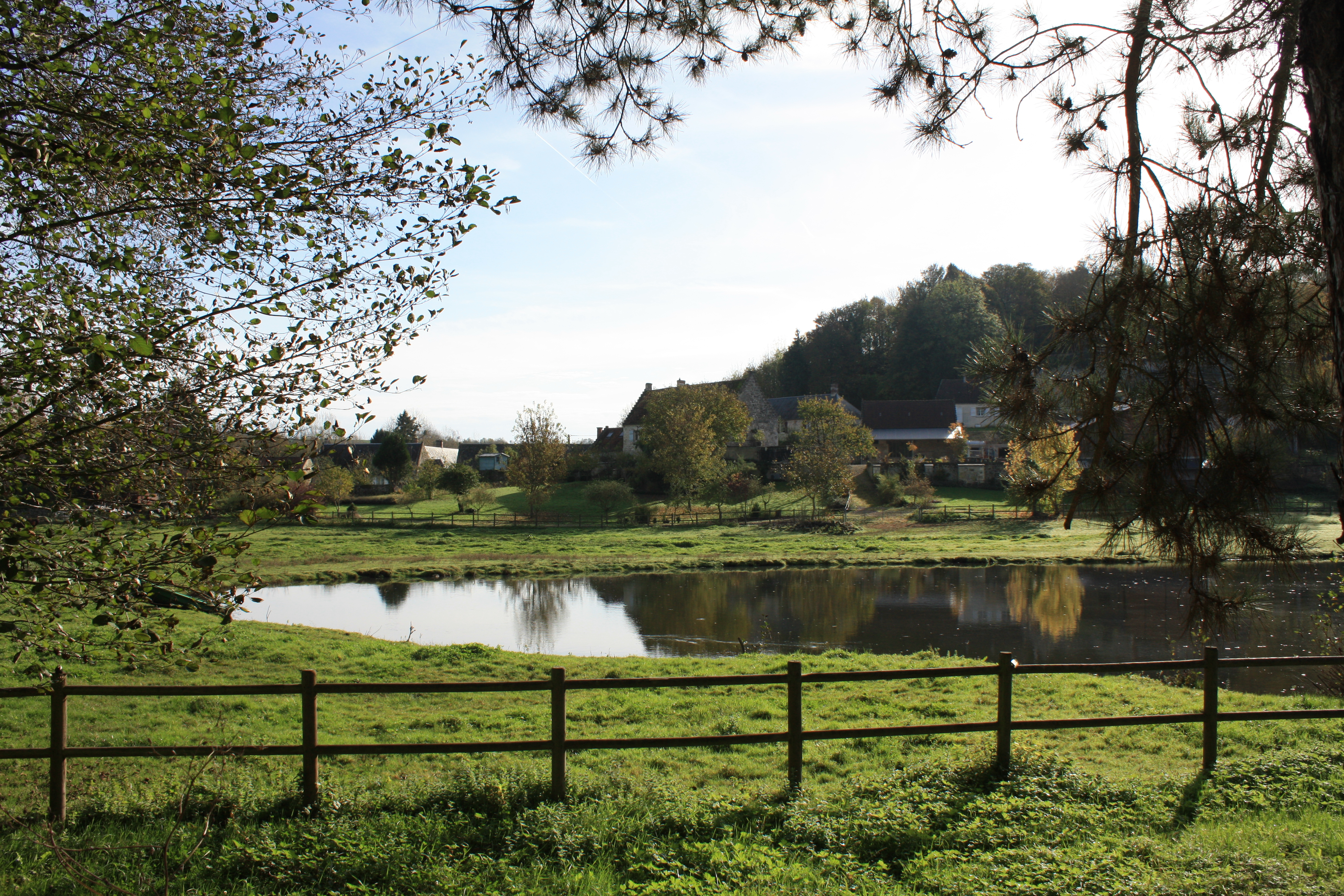
- A general view of Muret-et-Crouttes
- Location of Muret-et-Crouttes
- Location within France Location within Hauts-de-France
- Coordinates: 49°17′08″N 3°25′01″E
- Country: France
- Region: Hauts-de-France
- Department: Aisne
- Arrondissement: Soissons
- Canton: Villers-Cotterêts
- Intercommunality: Oulchy le Château

Government
  - Mayor (2026–32): Virginie Belezy
- Area^{1}: 5.24 km^{2} (2.02 sq mi)
- Elevation: 100 m (330 ft)
- Highest elevation: 151 m (495 ft)
- Lowest elevation: 76 m (249 ft)
- Population (2023): 117
  - Density: 22.3/km^{2} (57.8/sq mi)
- Time zone: UTC+01:00 (CET)
  - Summer (DST): UTC+02:00 (CEST)
- INSEE/Postal code: 02533 /02210
- ^{1} French Land Register data, which excludes lakes, ponds, glaciers > 1 km^{2} (0.386 sq mi or 247 acres) and river estuaries.

Muret-et-Crouttes (French pronunciation: [myʁɛ e kʁut]) is a commune in the Aisne department in Hauts-de-France in northern France.

== Population ==
Historical population
Year	Pop.	±% p.a.
1968	139	—
1975	93	−5.58%
1982	80	−2.13%
1990	88	+1.20%
1999	100	+1.43%
2007	131	+3.43%
2012	133	+0.30%
2017	119	−2.20%
2023	117	−0.28%
Source: INSEE

== See also ==
- Communes of the Aisne department
