= Celles-sur-Aisne =

- Commune
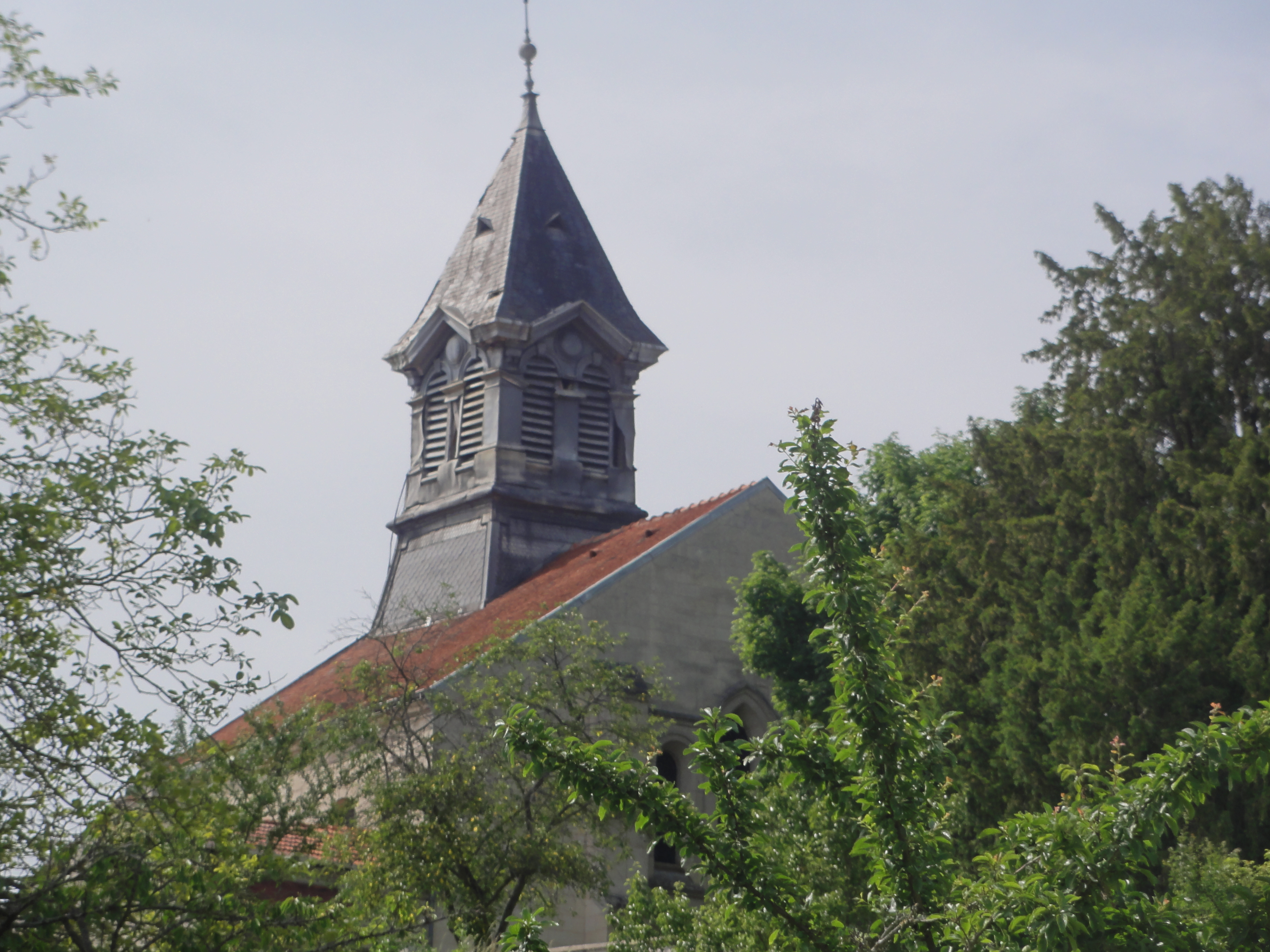
- The church of Celles-sur-Aisne
- Location of Celles-sur-Aisne
- Location within France Location within Hauts-de-France
- Coordinates: 49°24′25″N 3°28′57″E
- Country: France
- Region: Hauts-de-France
- Department: Aisne
- Arrondissement: Soissons
- Canton: Fère-en-Tardenois
- Intercommunality: Val de l'Aisne

Government
  - Mayor (2026–32): Jean-Pierre Geslin
- Area^{1}: 6.16 km^{2} (2.38 sq mi)
- Elevation: 75 m (246 ft)
- Highest elevation: 171 m (561 ft)
- Lowest elevation: 42 m (138 ft)
- Population (2023): 248
  - Density: 40.3/km^{2} (104/sq mi)
- Time zone: UTC+01:00 (CET)
  - Summer (DST): UTC+02:00 (CEST)
- INSEE/Postal code: 02148 /02370
- ^{1} French Land Register data, which excludes lakes, ponds, glaciers > 1 km^{2} (0.386 sq mi or 247 acres) and river estuaries.

Celles-sur-Aisne (French pronunciation: [sɛl syʁ ɛn], literally Celles on Aisne) is a commune in the Aisne department in Hauts-de-France in northern France.

== Population ==
Historical population
Year	Pop.	±% p.a.
1968	220	—
1975	224	+0.26%
1982	193	−2.11%
1990	216	+1.42%
1999	205	−0.58%
2007	250	+2.51%
2012	256	+0.48%
2017	258	+0.16%
2023	248	−0.66%
Source: INSEE

== See also ==
- Communes of the Aisne department
