= Villemontoire =

- Commune
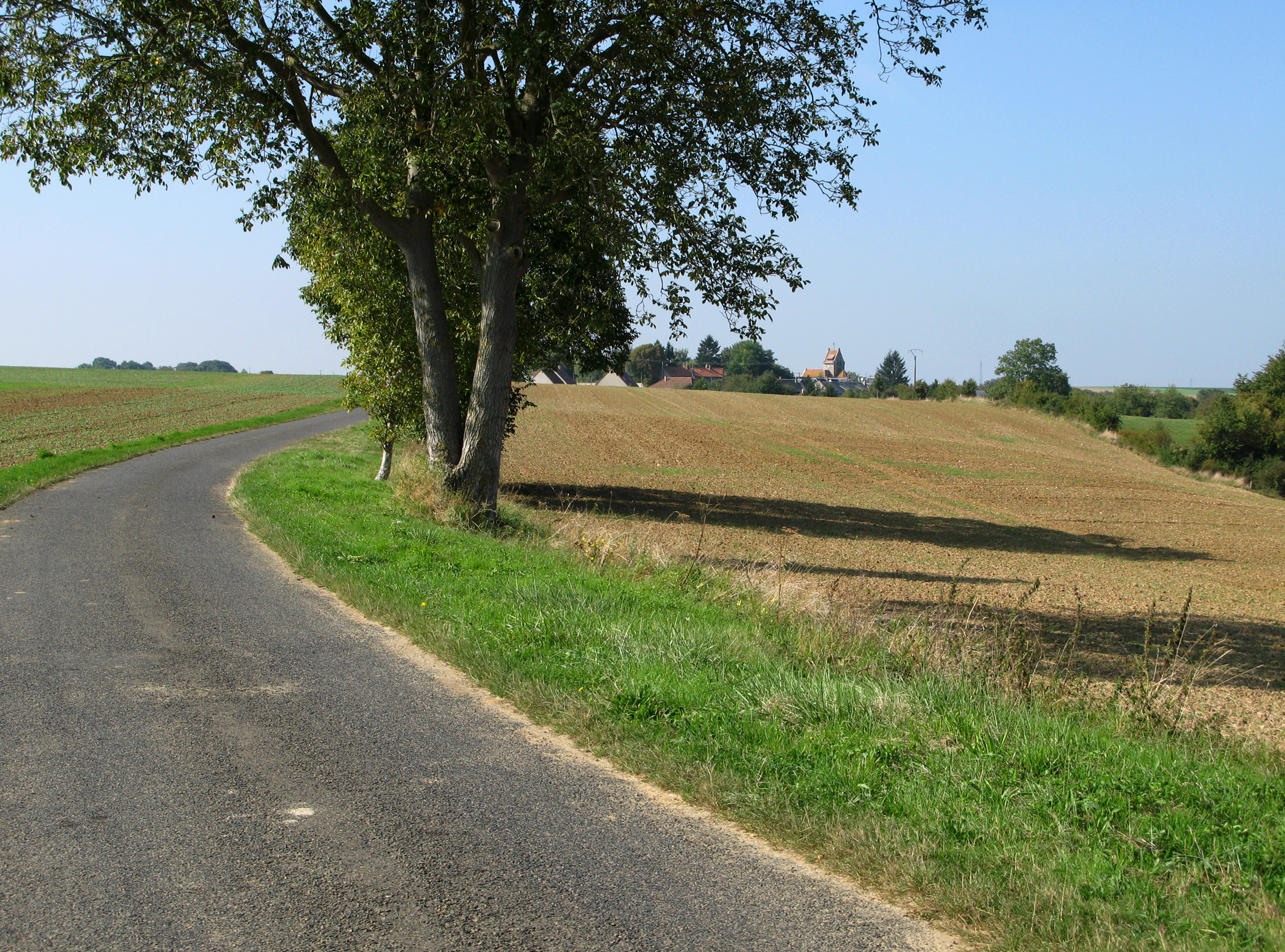
- A general view of Villemontoire
- Location of Villemontoire
- Location within France Location within Hauts-de-France
- Coordinates: 49°17′59″N 3°20′01″E
- Country: France
- Region: Hauts-de-France
- Department: Aisne
- Arrondissement: Soissons
- Canton: Villers-Cotterêts

Government
  - Mayor (2026–32): Valérie Pinheiro
- Area^{1}: 7.65 km^{2} (2.95 sq mi)
- Elevation: 91 m (299 ft)
- Highest elevation: 171 m (561 ft)
- Lowest elevation: 67 m (220 ft)
- Population (2023): 219
  - Density: 28.6/km^{2} (74.1/sq mi)
- Time zone: UTC+01:00 (CET)
  - Summer (DST): UTC+02:00 (CEST)
- INSEE/Postal code: 02804 /02210
- ^{1} French Land Register data, which excludes lakes, ponds, glaciers > 1 km^{2} (0.386 sq mi or 247 acres) and river estuaries.

Villemontoire (French pronunciation: [vilmɔ̃twaʁ]) is a commune in the Aisne department in Hauts-de-France in northern France.

== Population ==
Historical population
Year	Pop.	±% p.a.
1968	207	—
1975	185	−1.59%
1982	201	+1.19%
1990	221	+1.19%
1999	210	−0.57%
2007	210	+0.00%
2012	203	−0.68%
2017	186	−1.73%
2023	219	+2.76%
Source: INSEE

== See also ==
- Communes of the Aisne department
