= Saint-Rémy-Blanzy =

- Commune
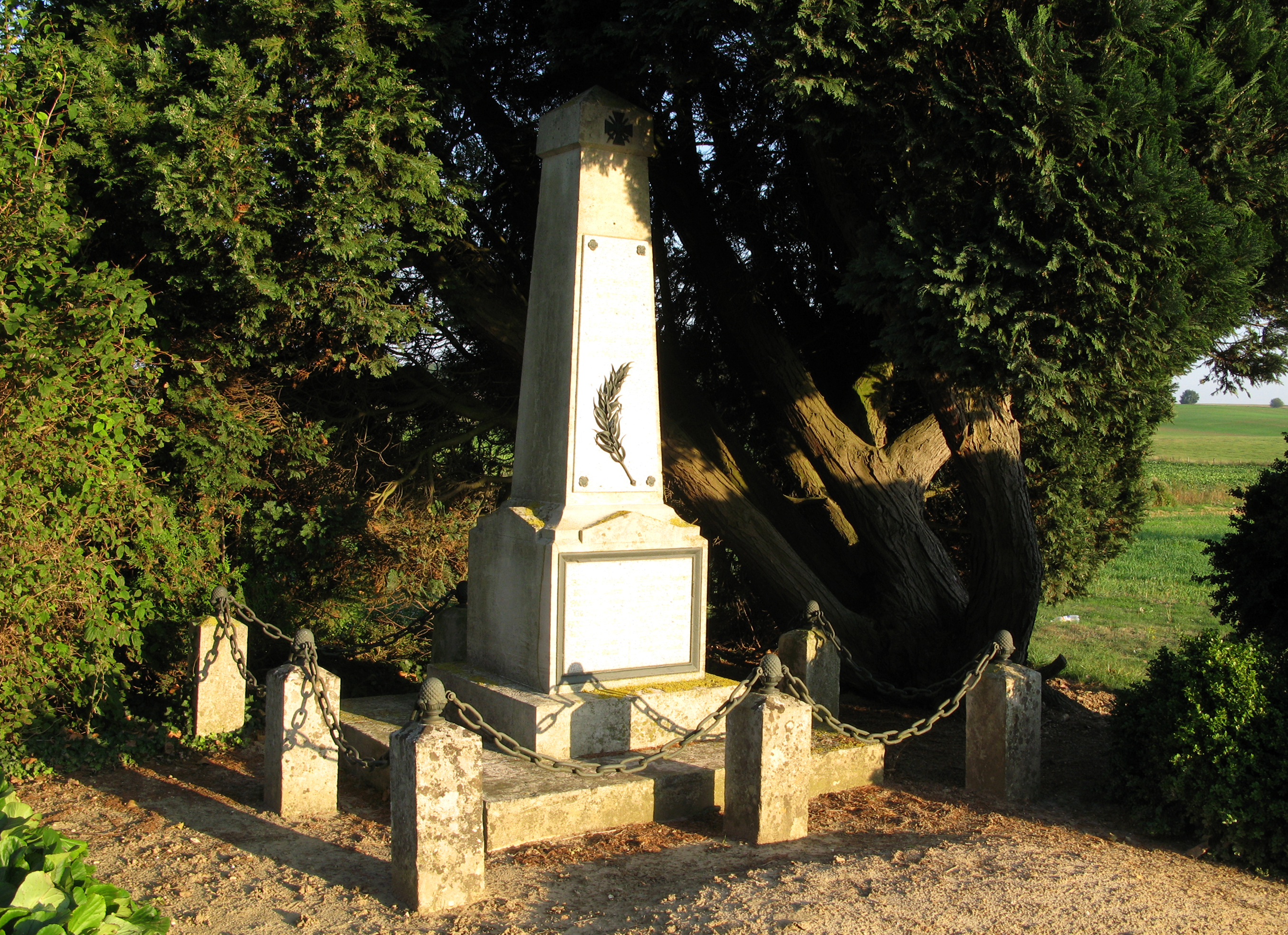
- War memorial
- Location of Saint-Rémy-Blanzy
- Location within France Location within Hauts-de-France
- Coordinates: 49°14′30″N 3°18′38″E
- Country: France
- Region: Hauts-de-France
- Department: Aisne
- Arrondissement: Soissons
- Canton: Villers-Cotterêts

Government
  - Mayor (2026–32): Marina Carette
- Area^{1}: 13.99 km^{2} (5.40 sq mi)
- Elevation: 170 m (560 ft)
- Highest elevation: 208 m (682 ft)
- Lowest elevation: 96 m (315 ft)
- Population (2023): 226
  - Density: 16.2/km^{2} (41.8/sq mi)
- Time zone: UTC+01:00 (CET)
  - Summer (DST): UTC+02:00 (CEST)
- INSEE/Postal code: 02693 /02210
- ^{1} French Land Register data, which excludes lakes, ponds, glaciers > 1 km^{2} (0.386 sq mi or 247 acres) and river estuaries.

Saint-Rémy-Blanzy (French pronunciation: [sɛ̃ ʁemi blɑ̃zi]) is a commune in the Aisne department in Hauts-de-France in northern France.

== Population ==
Historical population
Year	Pop.	±% p.a.
1968	234	—
1975	149	−6.24%
1982	125	−2.48%
1990	212	+6.83%
1999	203	−0.48%
2007	230	+1.57%
2012	225	−0.44%
2017	219	−0.54%
2023	226	+0.53%
Source: INSEE

== See also ==
- Communes of the Aisne department
