= Troësnes =

- Commune
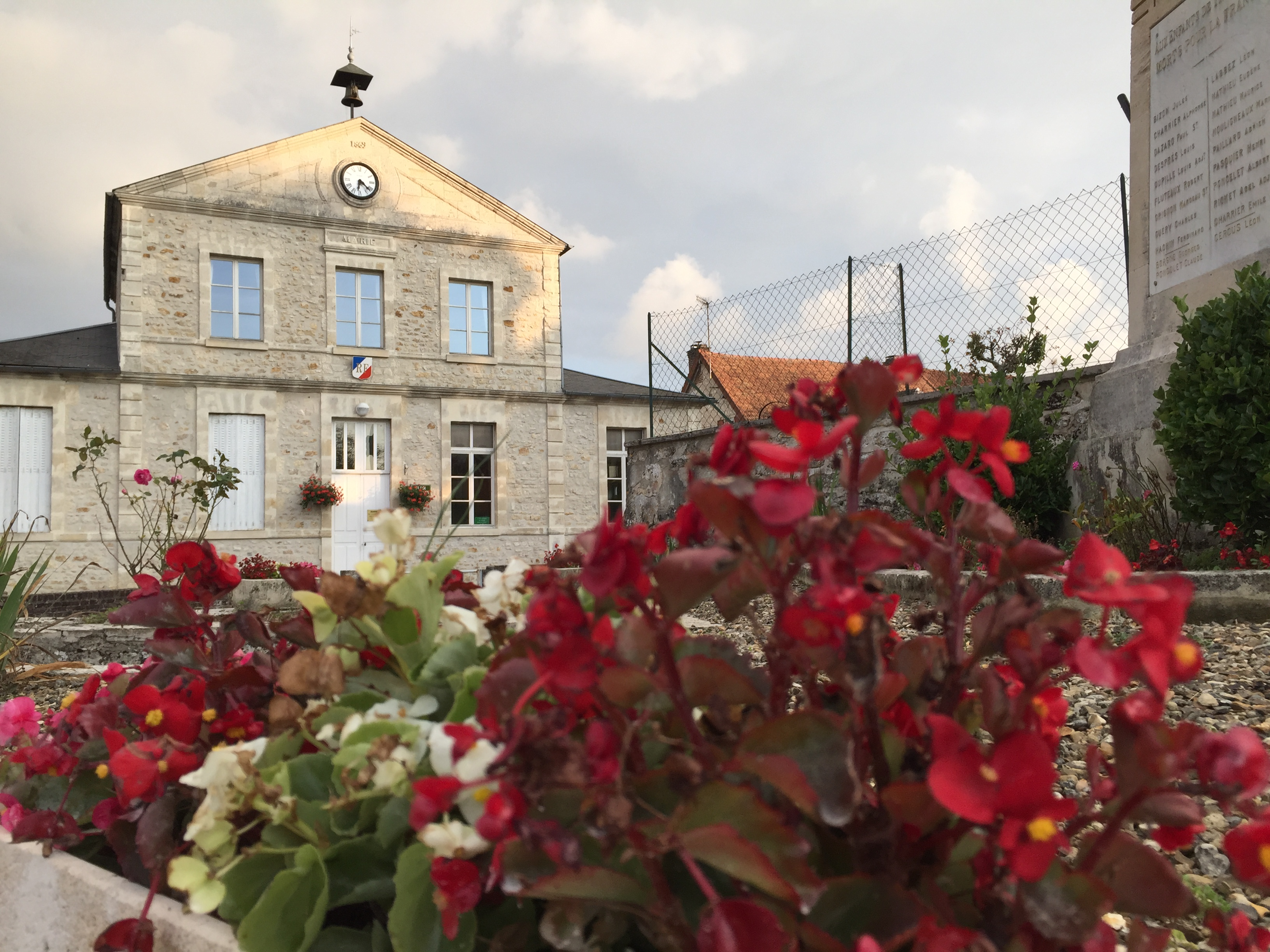
- The town hall of Troësnes
- Location of Troësnes
- Location within France Location within Hauts-de-France
- Coordinates: 49°11′38″N 3°10′14″E
- Country: France
- Region: Hauts-de-France
- Department: Aisne
- Arrondissement: Soissons
- Canton: Villers-Cotterêts
- Intercommunality: Retz en Valois

Government
  - Mayor (2026–32): Nathalie Gautier
- Area^{1}: 2.75 km^{2} (1.06 sq mi)
- Elevation: 70 m (230 ft)
- Highest elevation: 141 m (463 ft)
- Lowest elevation: 66 m (217 ft)
- Population (2023): 207
  - Density: 75.3/km^{2} (195/sq mi)
- Time zone: UTC+01:00 (CET)
  - Summer (DST): UTC+02:00 (CEST)
- INSEE/Postal code: 02749 /02460
- ^{1} French Land Register data, which excludes lakes, ponds, glaciers > 1 km^{2} (0.386 sq mi or 247 acres) and river estuaries.

Troësnes (French pronunciation: [tʁɔɛn]) is a commune in the Aisne department in Hauts-de-France in northern France.

== Population ==
Historical population
| Year | Pop. | ±% p.a. |
|---|---|---|
| 1968 | 125 | — |
| 1975 | 113 | −1.43% |
| 1982 | 117 | +0.50% |
| 1990 | 188 | +6.11% |
| 1999 | 213 | +1.40% |
| 2007 | 227 | +0.80% |
| 2012 | 242 | +1.29% |
| 2017 | 224 | −1.53% |
| 2023 | 207 | −1.31% |
Source: INSEE

== See also ==
- Communes of the Aisne department
