= Clamecy, Aisne =

Clamecy
- Commune
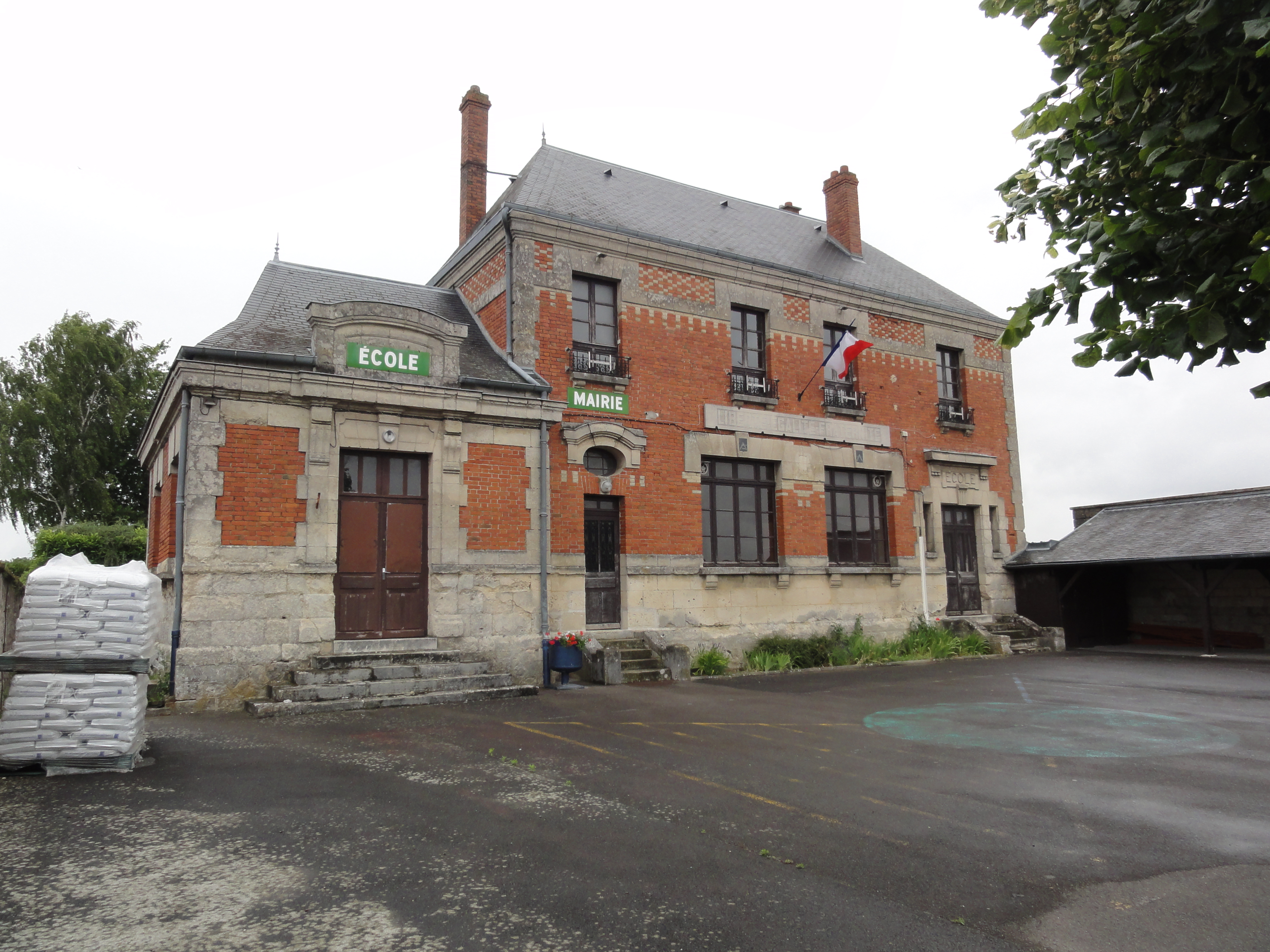
- The town hall and school of Clamecy
- Location of Clamecy
- Location within France Location within Hauts-de-France
- Coordinates: 49°25′43″N 3°21′43″E
- Country: France
- Region: Hauts-de-France
- Department: Aisne
- Arrondissement: Soissons
- Canton: Fère-en-Tardenois
- Intercommunality: Val de l'Aisne

Government
  - Mayor (2026–32): Thierry Ferté
- Area^{1}: 3.4 km^{2} (1.3 sq mi)
- Elevation: 141 m (463 ft)
- Highest elevation: 161 m (528 ft)
- Lowest elevation: 62 m (203 ft)
- Population (2023): 243
  - Density: 71/km^{2} (190/sq mi)
- Time zone: UTC+01:00 (CET)
  - Summer (DST): UTC+02:00 (CEST)
- INSEE/Postal code: 02198 /02880
- ^{1} French Land Register data, which excludes lakes, ponds, glaciers > 1 km^{2} (0.386 sq mi or 247 acres) and river estuaries.

Clamecy (French pronunciation: [klamsi]) is a commune in the Aisne department in Hauts-de-France in northern France.

== Population ==
Historical population
Year	Pop.	±% p.a.
1968	199	—
1975	198	−0.07%
1982	198	+0.00%
1990	292	+4.98%
1999	272	−0.79%
2007	232	−1.97%
2012	222	−0.88%
2017	228	+0.53%
2023	243	+1.07%
Source: INSEE

== See also ==
- Communes of the Aisne department
