= 02421 =

02421 may refer to:

- Lexington, Massachusetts, U.S., a town
- Kreuzau, Germany, a municipality
- Lesges, France, a commune
