= Courmont =

Courmont may refer to the following places in France:

- Courmont, Aisne, a commune in the department of Aisne
- Courmont, Haute-Saône, a commune in the department of Haute-Saône
