= Ciry =

- Ciry-le-Noble
- Ciry-Salsogne
