= Blanzy-lès-Fismes =

- Commune
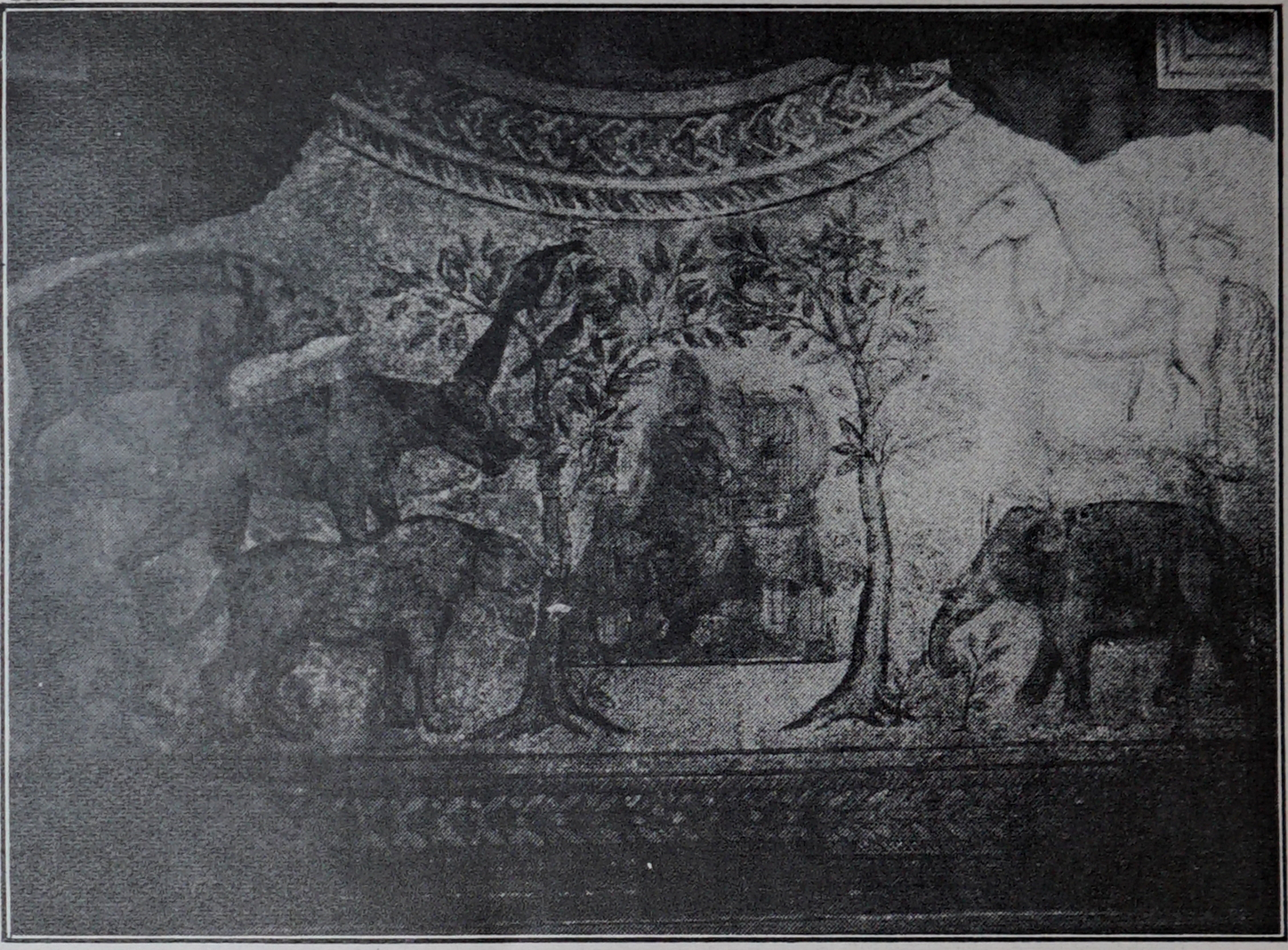
- The Blanzy mosaic
- Location of Blanzy-lès-Fismes
- Location within France Location within Hauts-de-France
- Coordinates: 49°20′21″N 3°40′26″E
- Country: France
- Region: Hauts-de-France
- Department: Aisne
- Arrondissement: Soissons
- Canton: Fère-en-Tardenois
- Intercommunality: Val de l'Aisne

Government
  - Mayor (2026–32): Aymeric Ferté
- Area^{1}: 5.27 km^{2} (2.03 sq mi)
- Highest elevation: 182 m (597 ft)
- Lowest elevation: 80 m (260 ft)
- Population (2023): 98
  - Density: 19/km^{2} (48/sq mi)
- Time zone: UTC+01:00 (CET)
  - Summer (DST): UTC+02:00 (CEST)
- INSEE/Postal code: 02091 /02160
- ^{1} French Land Register data, which excludes lakes, ponds, glaciers > 1 km^{2} (0.386 sq mi or 247 acres) and river estuaries.

Blanzy-lès-Fismes (French pronunciation: [blɑ̃zi lɛ fim], literally Blanzy near Fismes) is a commune in the department of Aisne in Hauts-de-France in northern France.

== Population ==
Historical population
Year	Pop.	±% p.a.
1968	121	—
1975	103	−2.27%
1982	95	−1.15%
1990	79	−2.28%
1999	94	+1.95%
2007	95	+0.13%
2012	98	+0.62%
2017	106	+1.58%
2023	98	−1.30%
Source: INSEE

== See also ==
- Communes of the Aisne department
