= Vasseny =

- Commune
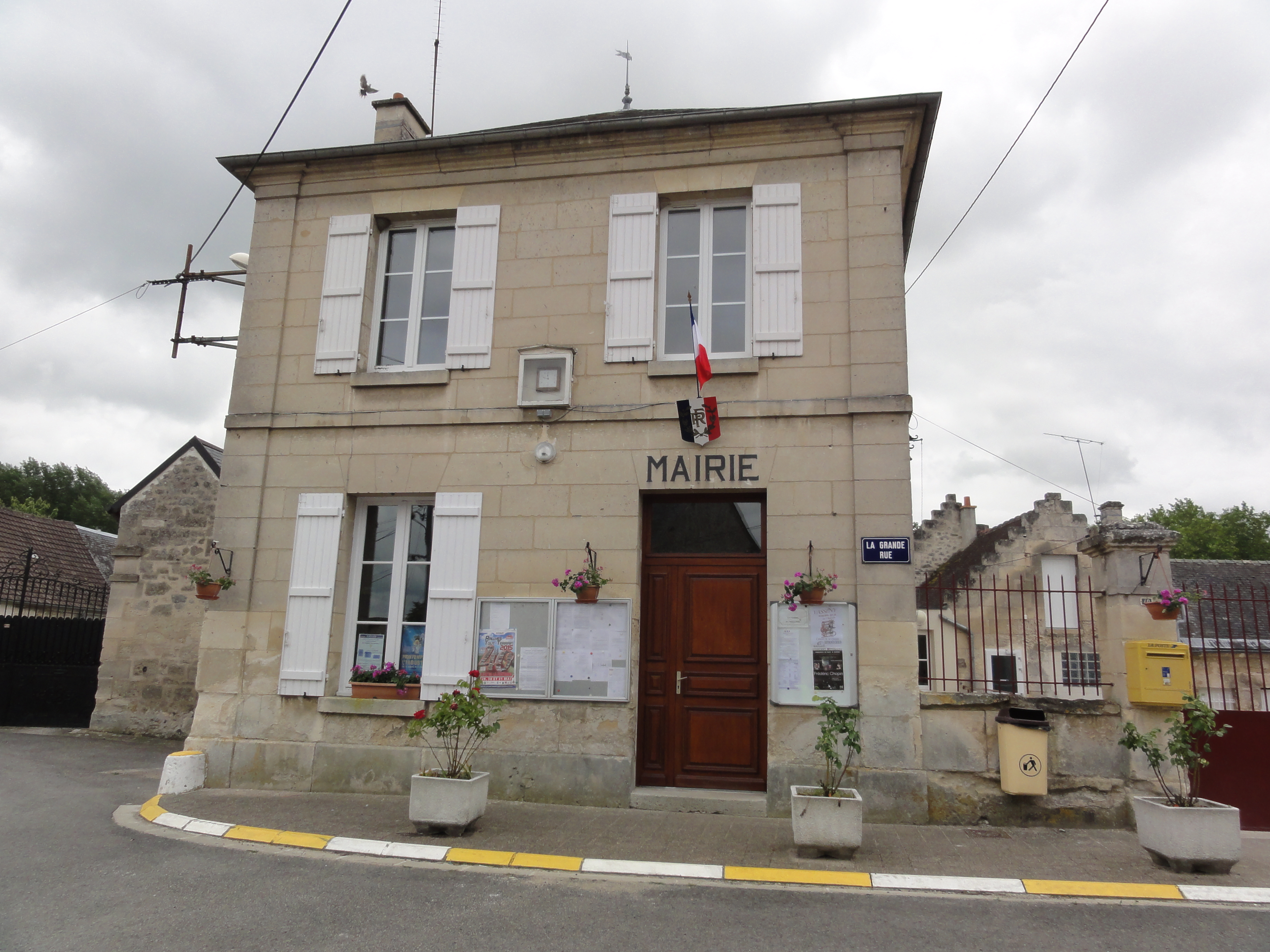
- The town hall of Vasseny
- Location of Vasseny
- Location within France Location within Hauts-de-France
- Coordinates: 49°21′15″N 3°29′12″E
- Country: France
- Region: Hauts-de-France
- Department: Aisne
- Arrondissement: Soissons
- Canton: Fère-en-Tardenois
- Intercommunality: Val de l'Aisne

Government
  - Mayor (2026–32): Dominique Marcellin
- Area^{1}: 3.18 km^{2} (1.23 sq mi)
- Elevation: 51 m (167 ft)
- Highest elevation: 155 m (509 ft)
- Lowest elevation: 46 m (151 ft)
- Population (2023): 197
  - Density: 61.9/km^{2} (160/sq mi)
- Time zone: UTC+01:00 (CET)
  - Summer (DST): UTC+02:00 (CEST)
- INSEE/Postal code: 02763 /02220
- ^{1} French Land Register data, which excludes lakes, ponds, glaciers > 1 km^{2} (0.386 sq mi or 247 acres) and river estuaries.

Vasseny is a commune in the Aisne department in Hauts-de-France in northern France.

== Population ==
Historical population
Year	Pop.	±% p.a.
1968	182	—
1975	146	−3.10%
1982	135	−1.11%
1990	131	−0.38%
1999	153	+1.74%
2007	201	+3.47%
2012	206	+0.49%
2017	215	+0.86%
2023	197	−1.45%
Source: INSEE

== See also ==
- Communes of the Aisne department
