= Beuvardes =

- Commune
- Location of Beuvardes
- Location within France Location within Hauts-de-France
- Coordinates: 49°08′34″N 3°29′25″E
- Country: France
- Region: Hauts-de-France
- Department: Aisne
- Arrondissement: Château-Thierry
- Canton: Fère-en-Tardenois
- Intercommunality: CA Région de Château-Thierry

Government
  - Mayor (2026–32): Catherine Richard
- Area^{1}: 15.66 km^{2} (6.05 sq mi)
- Elevation: 101 m (331 ft)
- Highest elevation: 226 m (741 ft)
- Lowest elevation: 131 m (430 ft)
- Population (2023): 736
  - Density: 47.0/km^{2} (122/sq mi)
- Time zone: UTC+01:00 (CET)
  - Summer (DST): UTC+02:00 (CEST)
- INSEE/Postal code: 02083 /02130
- ^{1} French Land Register data, which excludes lakes, ponds, glaciers > 1 km^{2} (0.386 sq mi or 247 acres) and river estuaries.

Beuvardes (French pronunciation: [bœvaʁd]) is a commune in the department of Aisne in Hauts-de-France in northern France.

== Population ==
Historical population
Year	Pop.	±% p.a.
1968	458	—
1975	479	+0.64%
1982	544	+1.83%
1990	642	+2.09%
1999	640	−0.03%
2007	709	+1.29%
2012	722	+0.36%
2017	749	+0.74%
2023	736	−0.29%
Source: INSEE

== See also ==
- Communes of the Aisne department
