= Canton of Fère-en-Tardenois =

Coordinates: 49°12′N 3°31′E

Fère-en-Tardenois
- Canton
- Interactive map of Fère-en-Tardenois
- Country: France
- Region: Hauts-de-France
- Department: Aisne
- No. of communes: {{{nbcomm}}}
- Area: 626.83 km^{2} (242.02 sq mi)
- Population (2023): 27,550
  - Density: 43.95/km^{2} (113.8/sq mi)
- INSEE code: 02 05

The canton of Fère-en-Tardenois is an administrative division in northern France. At the French canton reorganisation which came into effect in March 2015, the canton was expanded from 23 to 84 communes (11 of which merged into the new communes Les Septvallons, Bazoches-et-Saint-Thibaut and Pargny-et-Filain):

1. Aizy-Jouy
2. Allemant
3. Augy
4. Bazoches-et-Saint-Thibaut
5. Beuvardes
6. Blanzy-lès-Fismes
7. Braine
8. Braye
9. Brenelle
10. Bruyères-sur-Fère
11. Bruys
12. Bucy-le-Long
13. Celles-sur-Aisne
14. Cerseuil
15. Le Charmel
16. Chassemy
17. Chavignon
18. Chavonne
19. Chéry-Chartreuve
20. Chivres-Val
21. Cierges
22. Ciry-Salsogne
23. Clamecy
24. Condé-sur-Aisne
25. Coulonges-Cohan
26. Courcelles-sur-Vesle
27. Courmont
28. Couvrelles
29. Cys-la-Commune
30. Dhuizel
31. Dravegny
32. Fère-en-Tardenois
33. Fresnes-en-Tardenois
34. Goussancourt
35. Jouaignes
36. Laffaux
37. Lesges
38. Lhuys
39. Limé
40. Loupeigne
41. Mareuil-en-Dôle
42. Margival
43. Missy-sur-Aisne
44. Monampteuil
45. Mont-Notre-Dame
46. Mont-Saint-Martin
47. Nanteuil-la-Fosse
48. Nanteuil-Notre-Dame
49. Neuville-sur-Margival
50. Ostel
51. Paars
52. Pargny-et-Filain
53. Pont-Arcy
54. Presles-et-Boves
55. Quincy-sous-le-Mont
56. Ronchères
57. Saint-Mard
58. Sancy-les-Cheminots
59. Saponay
60. Les Septvallons
61. Sergy
62. Seringes-et-Nesles
63. Serval
64. Soupir
65. Tannières
66. Terny-Sorny
67. Vailly-sur-Aisne
68. Vasseny
69. Vaudesson
70. Vauxtin
71. Vézilly
72. Viel-Arcy
73. Villers-Agron-Aiguizy
74. Villers-sur-Fère
75. Ville-Savoye
76. Vuillery

== Demographics ==
Historical population
| Year | Pop. | ±% p.a. |
|---|---|---|
| 2013 | 28,004 | — |
| 2018 | 27,712 | −0.21% |
Source: INSEE

== See also ==
- Cantons of the Aisne department
