= Braye, Aisne =

Braye
- Commune
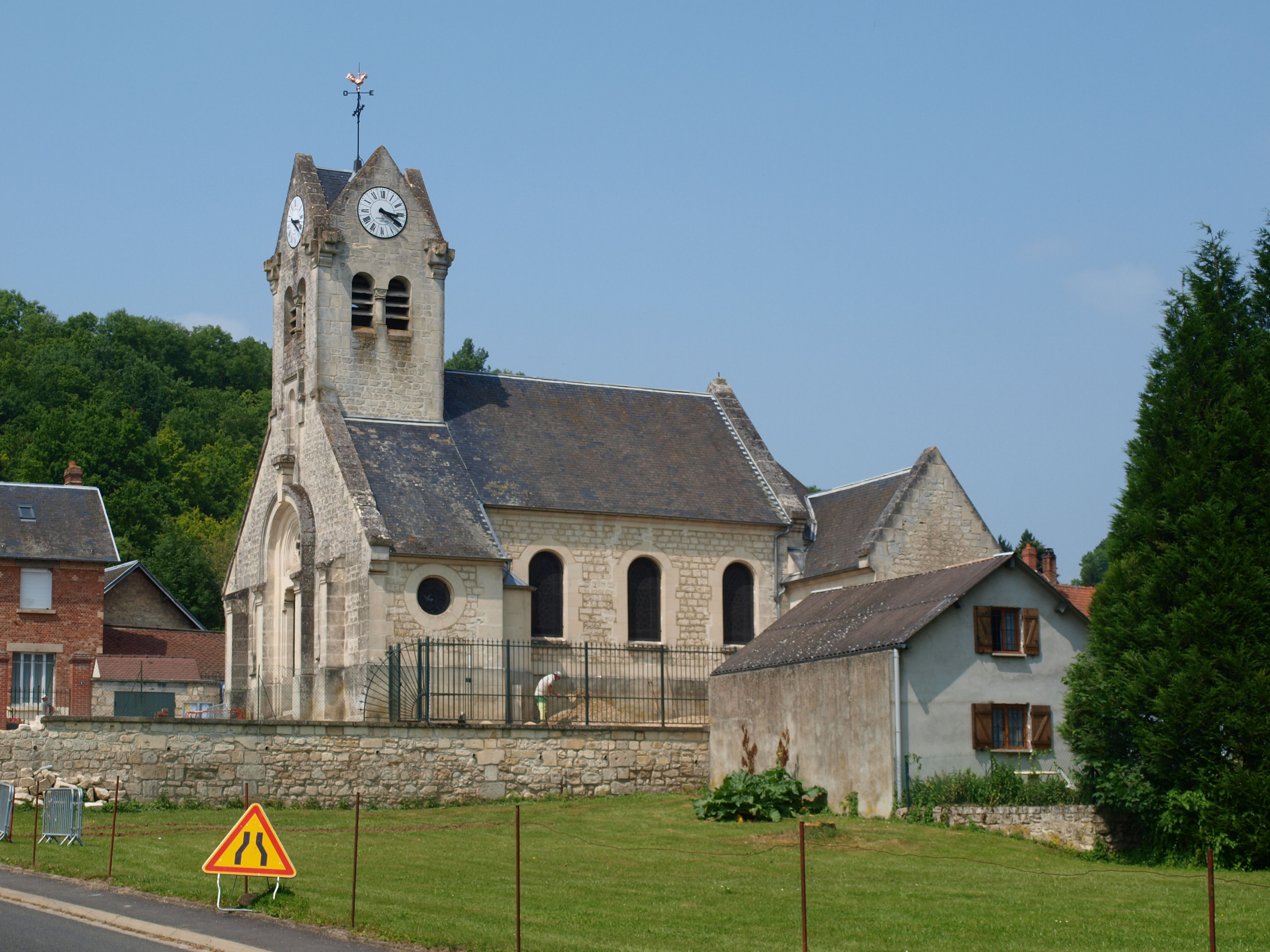
- The church of Braye
- Location of Braye
- Location within France Location within Hauts-de-France
- Coordinates: 49°25′27″N 3°22′14″E
- Country: France
- Region: Hauts-de-France
- Department: Aisne
- Arrondissement: Soissons
- Canton: Fère-en-Tardenois
- Intercommunality: Val de l'Aisne

Government
  - Mayor (2026–32): Jean-Marc Mennesson
- Area^{1}: 1.34 km^{2} (0.52 sq mi)
- Elevation: 70 m (230 ft)
- Highest elevation: 148 m (486 ft)
- Lowest elevation: 57 m (187 ft)
- Population (2023): 129
  - Density: 96.3/km^{2} (249/sq mi)
- Time zone: UTC+01:00 (CET)
  - Summer (DST): UTC+02:00 (CEST)
- INSEE/Postal code: 02118 /02880
- ^{1} French Land Register data, which excludes lakes, ponds, glaciers > 1 km^{2} (0.386 sq mi or 247 acres) and river estuaries.

Braye (French pronunciation: [bʁɛ]) is a commune in the department of Aisne in Hauts-de-France in northern France.

== Population ==
Historical population
Year	Pop.	±% p.a.
1968	92	—
1975	116	+3.37%
1982	130	+1.64%
1990	133	+0.29%
1999	131	−0.17%
2007	119	−1.19%
2012	119	+0.00%
2017	121	+0.33%
2023	129	+1.07%
Source: INSEE

== See also ==
- Communes of the Aisne department
