= Tannières =

- Commune
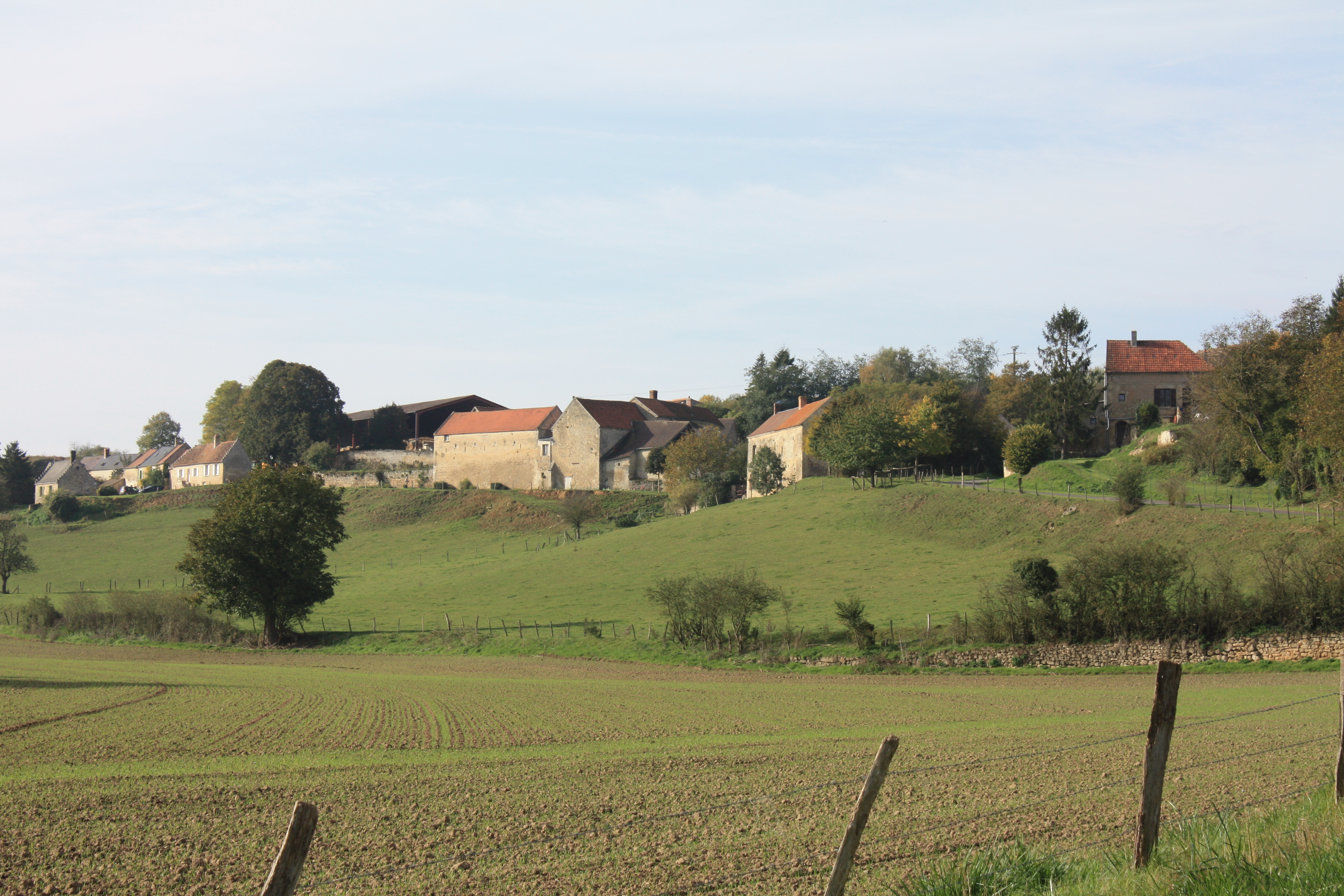
- A general view of Tannières
- Location of Tannières
- Location within France Location within Hauts-de-France
- Coordinates: 49°17′30″N 3°33′12″E
- Country: France
- Region: Hauts-de-France
- Department: Aisne
- Arrondissement: Soissons
- Canton: Fère-en-Tardenois
- Intercommunality: Val de l'Aisne

Government
  - Mayor (2026–32): Jean-Roch Le Roux
- Area^{1}: 2.55 km^{2} (0.98 sq mi)
- Elevation: 120 m (390 ft)
- Highest elevation: 141 m (463 ft)
- Lowest elevation: 64 m (210 ft)
- Population (2023): 16
  - Density: 6.3/km^{2} (16/sq mi)
- Time zone: UTC+01:00 (CET)
  - Summer (DST): UTC+02:00 (CEST)
- INSEE/Postal code: 02735 /02220
- ^{1} French Land Register data, which excludes lakes, ponds, glaciers > 1 km^{2} (0.386 sq mi or 247 acres) and river estuaries.

Tannières (French pronunciation: [tanjɛʁ]) is a commune in the Aisne department in Hauts-de-France in northern France.

== Population ==
Historical population
| Year | Pop. | ±% p.a. |
|---|---|---|
| 1968 | 49 | — |
| 1975 | 44 | −1.53% |
| 1982 | 37 | −2.44% |
| 1990 | 26 | −4.31% |
| 1999 | 24 | −0.89% |
| 2007 | 13 | −7.38% |
| 2012 | 14 | +1.49% |
| 2017 | 16 | +2.71% |
| 2023 | 16 | +0.00% |
Source: INSEE

With a population of only 16 in 2023, Tannières is the least populated commune in the department of Aisne.

== See also ==
- Communes of the Aisne department
