= Brenelle =

- Commune
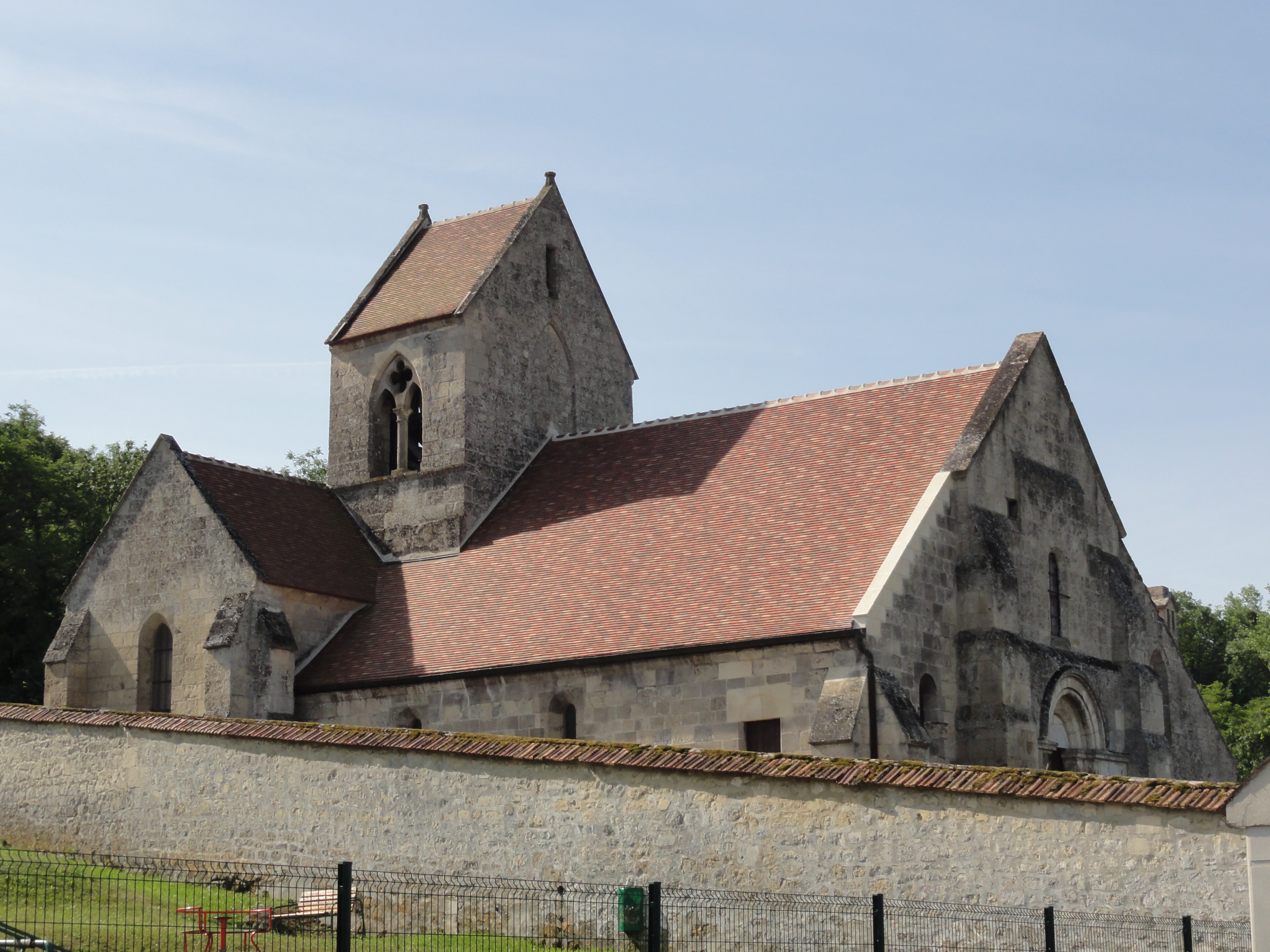
- The church of Brenelle
- Location of Brenelle
- Location within France Location within Hauts-de-France
- Coordinates: 49°22′00″N 3°32′38″E
- Country: France
- Region: Hauts-de-France
- Department: Aisne
- Arrondissement: Soissons
- Canton: Fère-en-Tardenois
- Intercommunality: Val de l'Aisne

Government
  - Mayor (2026–32): Bertrand Detaille
- Area^{1}: 4.34 km^{2} (1.68 sq mi)
- Elevation: 150 m (490 ft)
- Highest elevation: 174 m (571 ft)
- Lowest elevation: 60 m (200 ft)
- Population (2023): 193
  - Density: 44.5/km^{2} (115/sq mi)
- Time zone: UTC+01:00 (CET)
  - Summer (DST): UTC+02:00 (CEST)
- INSEE/Postal code: 02120 /02220
- ^{1} French Land Register data, which excludes lakes, ponds, glaciers > 1 km^{2} (0.386 sq mi or 247 acres) and river estuaries.

Brenelle (French pronunciation: [bʁənɛl]) is a commune in the department of Aisne in Hauts-de-France in northern France. It is located 20 km east of Soissons.

== Population ==
Historical population
Year	Pop.	±% p.a.
1968	204	—
1975	168	−2.74%
1982	189	+1.70%
1990	184	−0.33%
1999	190	+0.36%
2007	183	−0.47%
2012	196	+1.38%
2017	195	−0.10%
2023	193	−0.17%
Source: INSEE

== See also ==
- Communes of the Aisne department
