= Le Charmel =

- Commune
- Location of Le Charmel
- Location within France Location within Hauts-de-France
- Coordinates: 49°06′50″N 3°33′00″E
- Country: France
- Region: Hauts-de-France
- Department: Aisne
- Arrondissement: Château-Thierry
- Canton: Fère-en-Tardenois
- Intercommunality: CA Région de Château-Thierry

Government
  - Mayor (2026–32): Julien Laluc
- Area^{1}: 9.83 km^{2} (3.80 sq mi)
- Elevation: 180 m (590 ft)
- Highest elevation: 225 m (738 ft)
- Lowest elevation: 73 m (240 ft)
- Population (2023): 323
  - Density: 32.9/km^{2} (85.1/sq mi)
- Time zone: UTC+01:00 (CET)
  - Summer (DST): UTC+02:00 (CEST)
- INSEE/Postal code: 02164 /02850
- ^{1} French Land Register data, which excludes lakes, ponds, glaciers > 1 km^{2} (0.386 sq mi or 247 acres) and river estuaries.

Le Charmel (French pronunciation: [lə ʃaʁmɛl]) is a commune in the Aisne department in Hauts-de-France in northern France.

== Population ==
Historical population
Year	Pop.	±% p.a.
1968	206	—
1975	180	−1.91%
1982	249	+4.74%
1990	268	+0.92%
1999	282	+0.57%
2007	328	+1.91%
2012	325	−0.18%
2017	316	−0.56%
2023	323	+0.37%
Source: INSEE

== See also ==
- Communes of the Aisne department
