= Dravegny =

- Commune
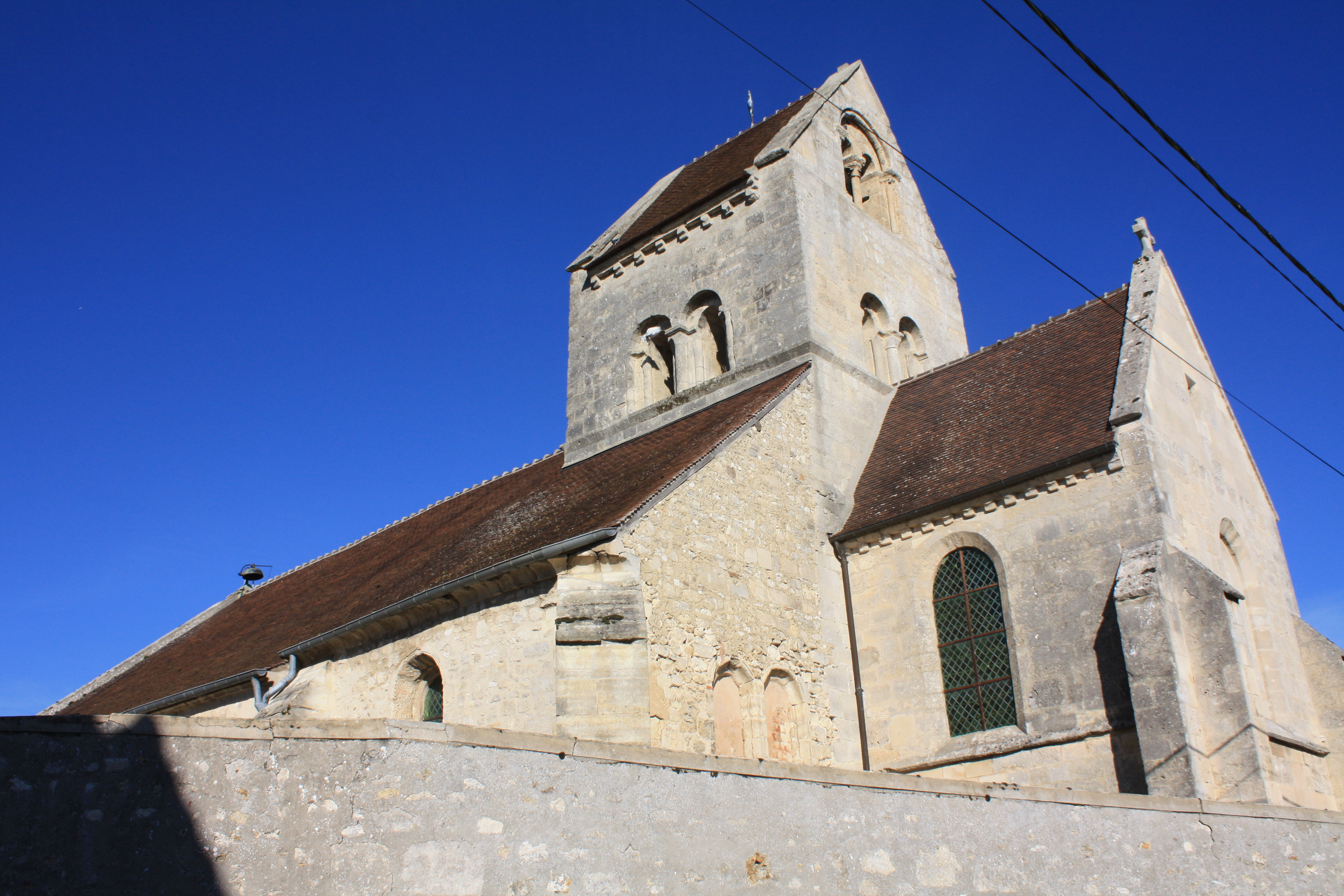
- The church of Dravegny
- Location of Dravegny
- Location within France Location within Hauts-de-France
- Coordinates: 49°13′51″N 3°38′20″E
- Country: France
- Region: Hauts-de-France
- Department: Aisne
- Arrondissement: Château-Thierry
- Canton: Fère-en-Tardenois
- Intercommunality: CA Région de Château-Thierry

Government
  - Mayor (2026–32): Françoise Fernandez
- Area^{1}: 15.67 km^{2} (6.05 sq mi)
- Elevation: 169 m (554 ft)
- Highest elevation: 227 m (745 ft)
- Lowest elevation: 82 m (269 ft)
- Population (2023): 134
  - Density: 8.55/km^{2} (22.1/sq mi)
- Time zone: UTC+01:00 (CET)
  - Summer (DST): UTC+02:00 (CEST)
- INSEE/Postal code: 02271 /02130
- ^{1} French Land Register data, which excludes lakes, ponds, glaciers > 1 km^{2} (0.386 sq mi or 247 acres) and river estuaries.

Dravegny (French pronunciation: [dʁavɲi]) is a commune in the Aisne department in Hauts-de-France in northern France.

== Population ==
Historical population
Year	Pop.	±% p.a.
1968	194	—
1975	167	−2.12%
1982	166	−0.09%
1990	139	−2.19%
1999	149	+0.77%
2007	149	+0.00%
2012	150	+0.13%
2017	132	−2.52%
2023	134	+0.25%
Source: INSEE

== See also ==
- Communes of the Aisne department
