= Jouaignes =

- Commune
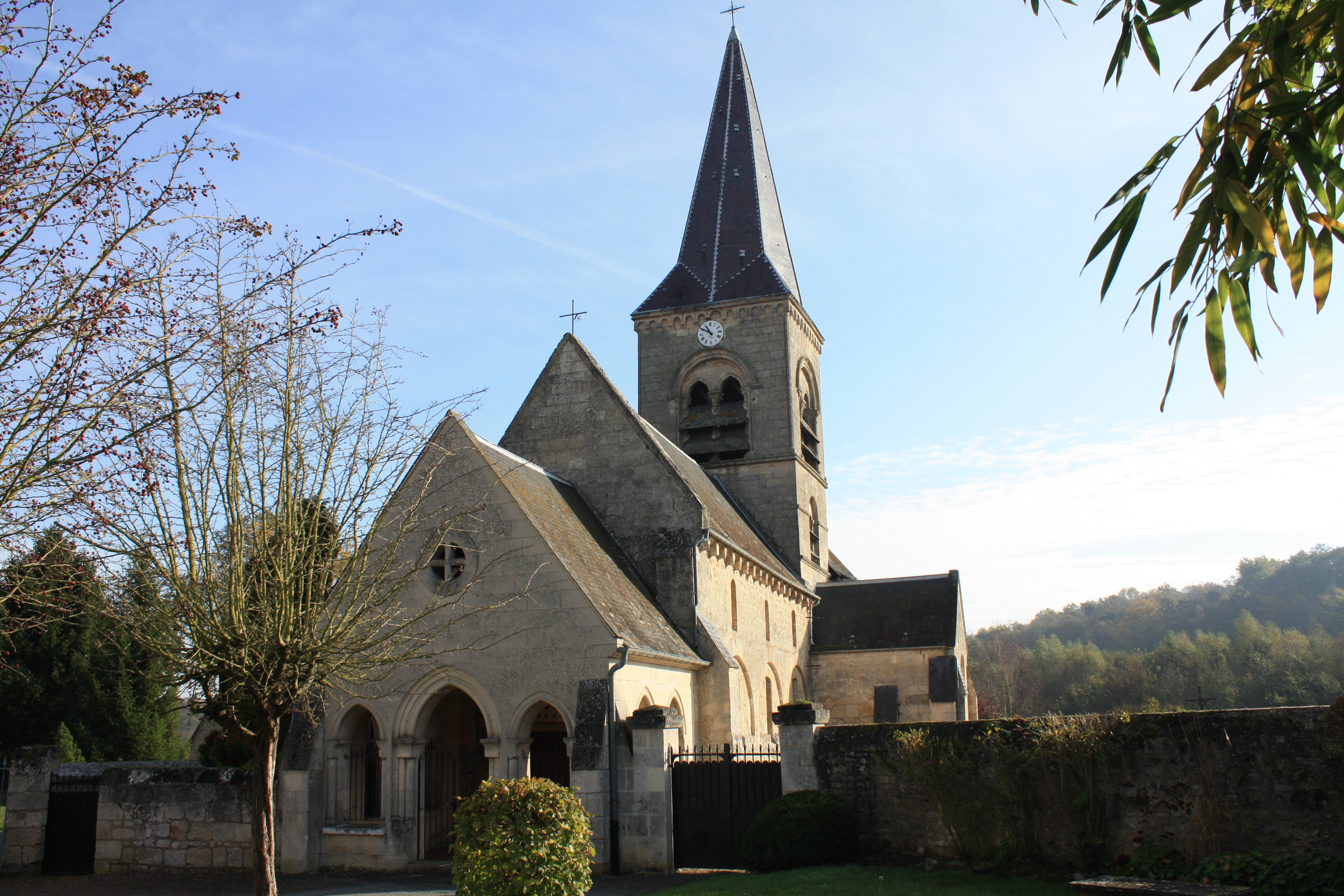
- Jouaignes church
- Location of Jouaignes
- Location within France Location within Hauts-de-France
- Coordinates: 49°17′57″N 3°32′12″E
- Country: France
- Region: Hauts-de-France
- Department: Aisne
- Arrondissement: Soissons
- Canton: Fère-en-Tardenois
- Intercommunality: Val de l'Aisne

Government
  - Mayor (2026–32): Mickaël Alizard
- Area^{1}: 7.84 km^{2} (3.03 sq mi)
- Elevation: 16 m (52 ft)
- Highest elevation: 142 m (466 ft)
- Lowest elevation: 68 m (223 ft)
- Population (2023): 141
  - Density: 18.0/km^{2} (46.6/sq mi)
- Time zone: UTC+01:00 (CET)
  - Summer (DST): UTC+02:00 (CEST)
- INSEE/Postal code: 02393 /02220
- ^{1} French Land Register data, which excludes lakes, ponds, glaciers > 1 km^{2} (0.386 sq mi or 247 acres) and river estuaries.

Jouaignes (French pronunciation: [ʒwɛɲ]) is a commune in the Aisne department and Hauts-de-France region of northern France.

== Population ==
Historical population
| Year | Pop. | ±% p.a. |
|---|---|---|
| 1968 | 173 | — |
| 1975 | 143 | −2.68% |
| 1982 | 143 | +0.00% |
| 1990 | 133 | −0.90% |
| 1999 | 151 | +1.42% |
| 2007 | 166 | +1.19% |
| 2012 | 155 | −1.36% |
| 2017 | 144 | −1.46% |
| 2023 | 141 | −0.35% |
Source: INSEE

== See also ==
- Communes of the Aisne department
