= Vauxtin =

- Commune
- Location of Vauxtin
- Location within France Location within Hauts-de-France
- Coordinates: 49°21′04″N 3°36′15″E
- Country: France
- Region: Hauts-de-France
- Department: Aisne
- Arrondissement: Soissons
- Canton: Fère-en-Tardenois
- Intercommunality: Val de l'Aisne

Government
  - Mayor (2026–32): Joanne Degouve
- Area^{1}: 2.27 km^{2} (0.88 sq mi)
- Elevation: 145 m (476 ft)
- Highest elevation: 173 m (568 ft)
- Lowest elevation: 80 m (260 ft)
- Population (2023): 43
  - Density: 19/km^{2} (49/sq mi)
- Time zone: UTC+01:00 (CET)
  - Summer (DST): UTC+02:00 (CEST)
- INSEE/Postal code: 02773 /02220
- ^{1} French Land Register data, which excludes lakes, ponds, glaciers > 1 km^{2} (0.386 sq mi or 247 acres) and river estuaries.

Vauxtin (French pronunciation: [votɛ̃]) is a commune in the Aisne department in Hauts-de-France in northern France.

== Population ==
Historical population
Year	Pop.	±% p.a.
1968	37	—
1975	45	+2.84%
1982	32	−4.75%
1990	36	+1.48%
1999	51	+3.95%
2007	49	−0.50%
2012	49	+0.00%
2017	39	−4.46%
2023	43	+1.64%
Source: INSEE

== See also ==
- Communes of the Aisne department
