= Cys-la-Commune =

- Commune
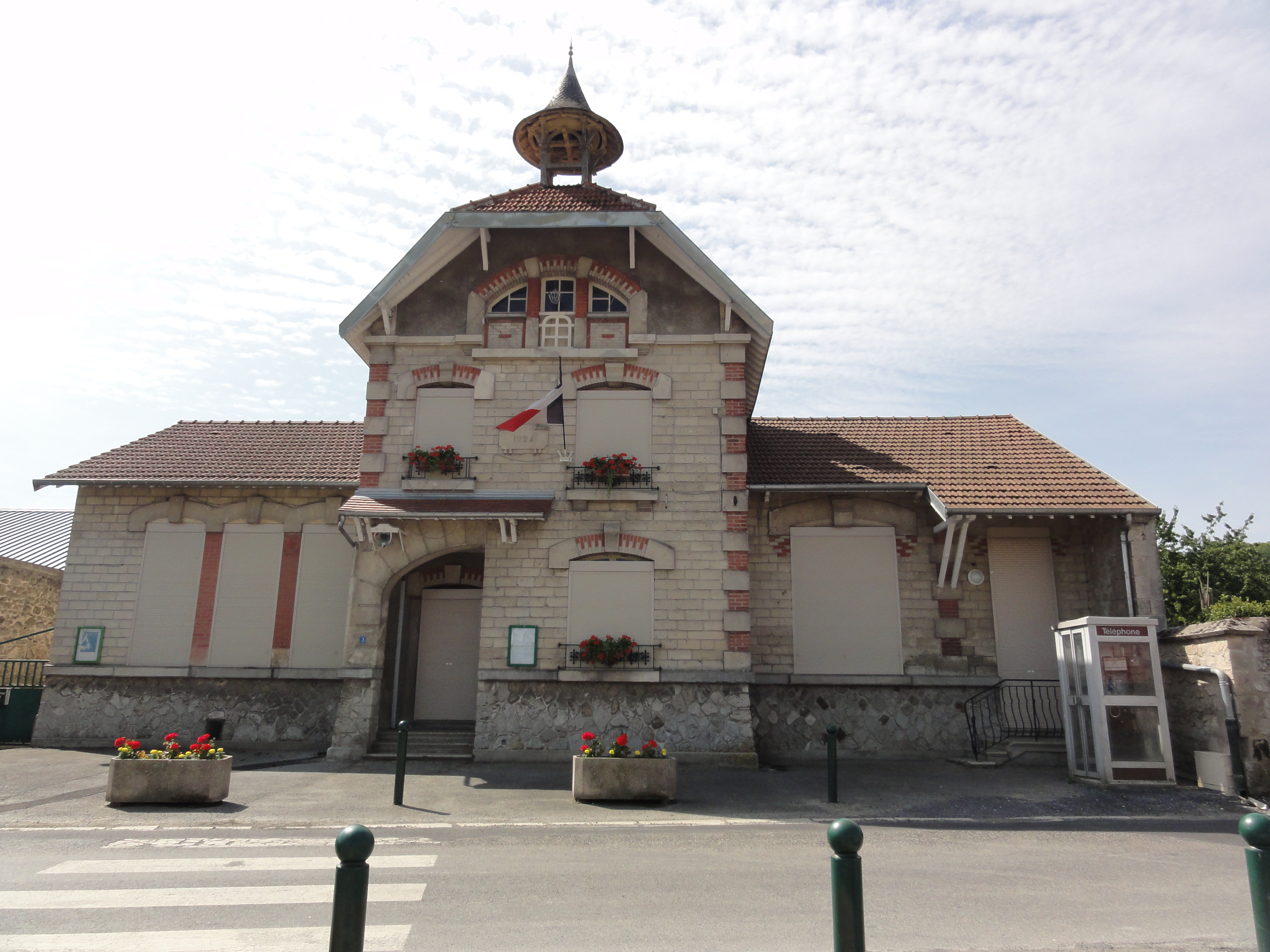
- The town hall of Cys-la-Commune
- Location of Cys-la-Commune
- Location within France Location within Hauts-de-France
- Coordinates: 49°23′33″N 3°34′23″E
- Country: France
- Region: Hauts-de-France
- Department: Aisne
- Arrondissement: Soissons
- Canton: Fère-en-Tardenois
- Intercommunality: Val de l'Aisne

Government
  - Mayor (2026–32): Julien Lacour
- Area^{1}: 4.39 km^{2} (1.69 sq mi)
- Elevation: 66 m (217 ft)
- Highest elevation: 177 m (581 ft)
- Lowest elevation: 44 m (144 ft)
- Population (2023): 161
  - Density: 36.7/km^{2} (95.0/sq mi)
- Time zone: UTC+01:00 (CET)
  - Summer (DST): UTC+02:00 (CEST)
- INSEE/Postal code: 02255 /02220
- ^{1} French Land Register data, which excludes lakes, ponds, glaciers > 1 km^{2} (0.386 sq mi or 247 acres) and river estuaries.

Cys-la-Commune is a commune in the Aisne department in Hauts-de-France in northern France.

== Population ==
Historical population
Year	Pop.	±% p.a.
1968	144	—
1975	126	−1.89%
1982	127	+0.11%
1990	120	−0.71%
1999	127	+0.63%
2007	141	+1.32%
2012	151	+1.38%
2017	143	−1.08%
2023	161	+2.00%
Source: INSEE

== See also ==
- Communes of the Aisne department
