= Vuillery =

- Commune
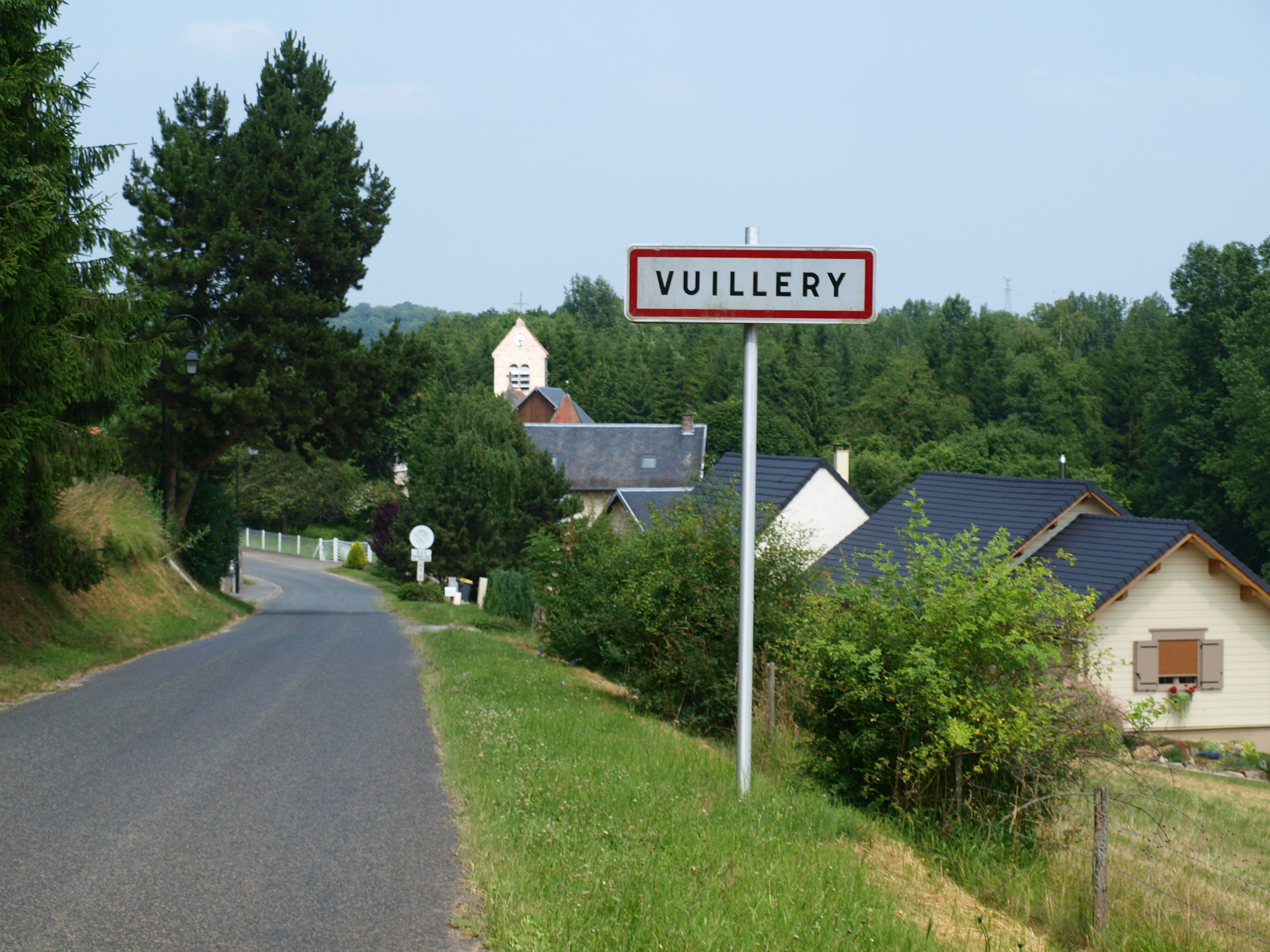
- The road into Vuillery
- Location of Vuillery
- Location within France Location within Hauts-de-France
- Coordinates: 49°25′52″N 3°23′15″E
- Country: France
- Region: Hauts-de-France
- Department: Aisne
- Arrondissement: Soissons
- Canton: Fère-en-Tardenois
- Intercommunality: Val de l'Aisne

Government
  - Mayor (2026–32): Sébastien Ponthieux
- Area^{1}: 1.09 km^{2} (0.42 sq mi)
- Elevation: 71 m (233 ft)
- Highest elevation: 149 m (489 ft)
- Lowest elevation: 61 m (200 ft)
- Population (2023): 43
  - Density: 39/km^{2} (100/sq mi)
- Time zone: UTC+01:00 (CET)
  - Summer (DST): UTC+02:00 (CEST)
- INSEE/Postal code: 02829 /02880
- ^{1} French Land Register data, which excludes lakes, ponds, glaciers > 1 km^{2} (0.386 sq mi or 247 acres) and river estuaries.

Vuillery (French pronunciation: [vɥijʁi]) is a commune in the Aisne department in Hauts-de-France in northern France.

== Population ==
Historical population
Year	Pop.	±% p.a.
1968	30	—
1975	26	−2.02%
1982	20	−3.68%
1990	31	+5.63%
1999	24	−2.80%
2007	31	+3.25%
2012	39	+4.70%
2017	43	+1.97%
2023	43	+0.00%
Source: INSEE

== See also ==
- Communes of the Aisne department
