= Ville-Savoye =

- Commune
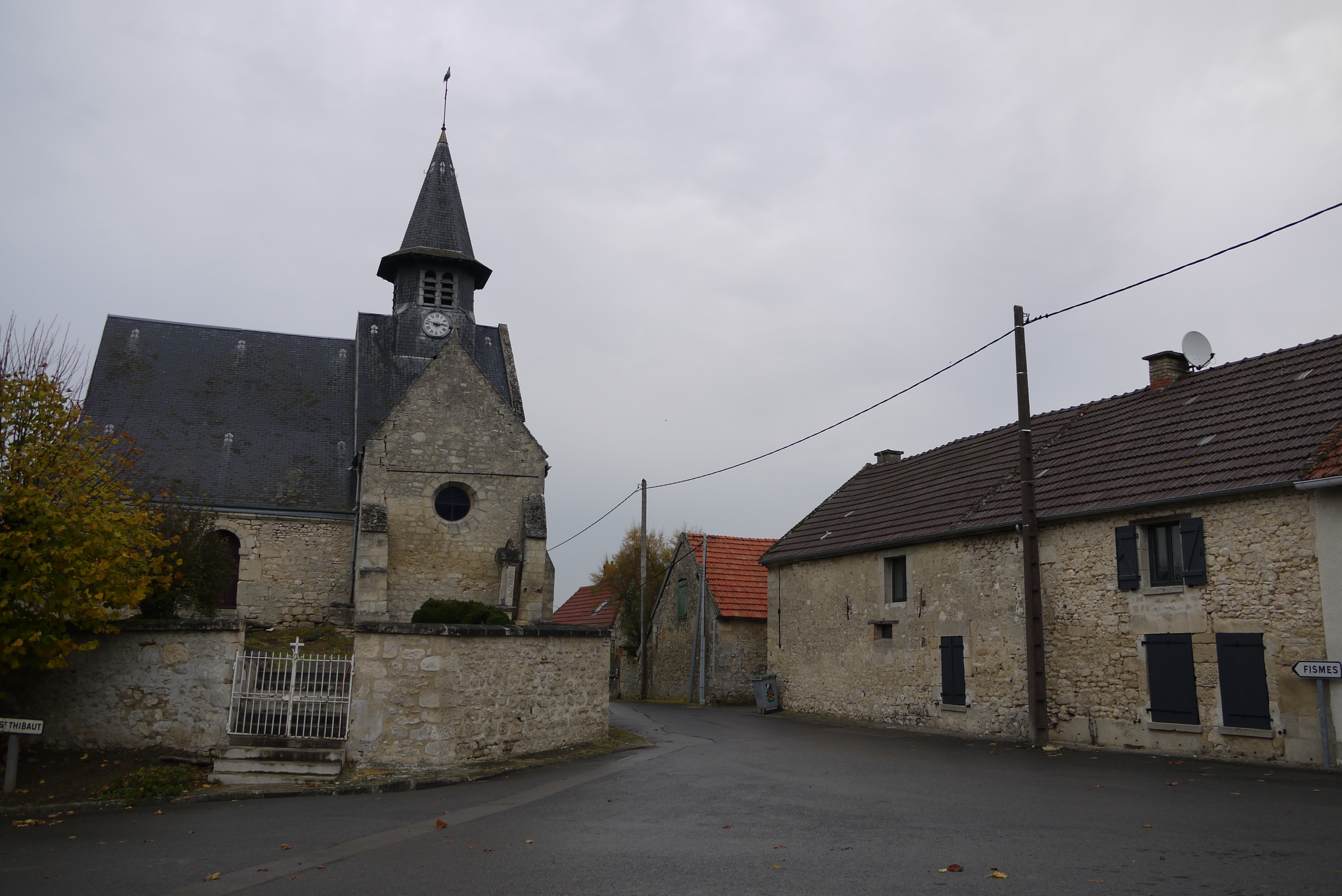
- St Vedast church in Ville-Savoye
- Location of Ville-Savoye
- Location within France Location within Hauts-de-France
- Coordinates: 49°17′40″N 3°38′27″E
- Country: France
- Region: Hauts-de-France
- Department: Aisne
- Arrondissement: Soissons
- Canton: Fère-en-Tardenois
- Intercommunality: Val de l'Aisne

Government
  - Mayor (2026–32): Patrick Melling
- Area^{1}: 2.64 km^{2} (1.02 sq mi)
- Elevation: 87 m (285 ft)
- Highest elevation: 163 m (535 ft)
- Lowest elevation: 55 m (180 ft)
- Population (2023): 84
  - Density: 32/km^{2} (82/sq mi)
- Time zone: UTC+01:00 (CET)
  - Summer (DST): UTC+02:00 (CEST)
- INSEE/Postal code: 02817 /02220
- ^{1} French Land Register data, which excludes lakes, ponds, glaciers > 1 km^{2} (0.386 sq mi or 247 acres) and river estuaries.

Ville-Savoye (French pronunciation: [vil savwa]) is a commune in the Aisne department and Hauts-de-France region of northern France.

== Population ==
Historical population
Year	Pop.	±% p.a.
1968	64	—
1975	71	+1.49%
1982	55	−3.58%
1990	55	+0.00%
1999	58	+0.59%
2007	58	+0.00%
2012	62	+1.34%
2017	82	+5.75%
2023	84	+0.40%
Source: INSEE

== See also ==
- Communes of the Aisne department
