= Viel-Arcy =

- Commune
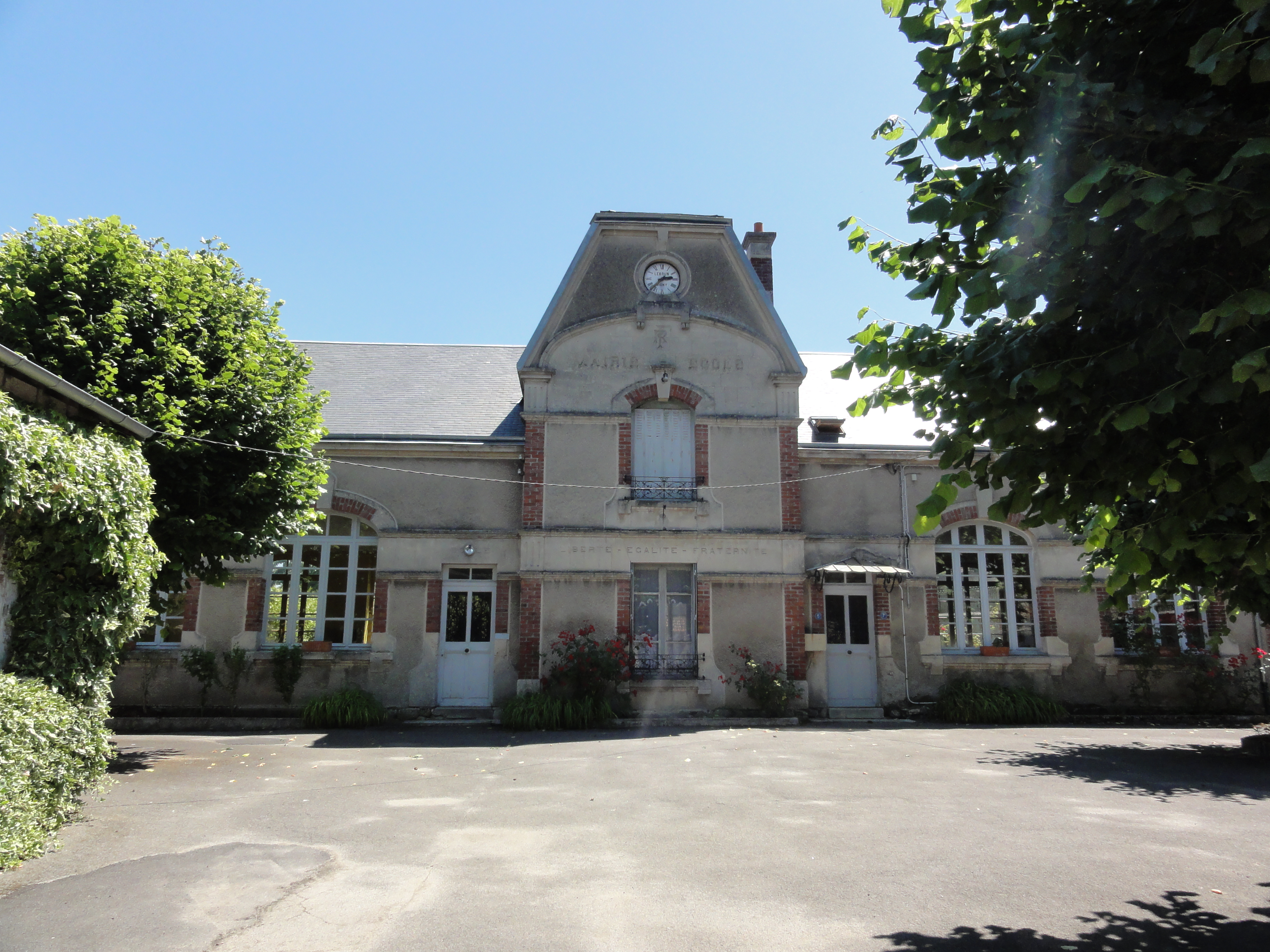
- The town hall and school of Viel-Arcy
- Location of Viel-Arcy
- Location within France Location within Hauts-de-France
- Coordinates: 49°22′50″N 3°37′30″E
- Country: France
- Region: Hauts-de-France
- Department: Aisne
- Arrondissement: Soissons
- Canton: Fère-en-Tardenois
- Intercommunality: Val de l'Aisne

Government
  - Mayor (2026–32): Thierry Coutant
- Area^{1}: 6.59 km^{2} (2.54 sq mi)
- Elevation: 78 m (256 ft)
- Highest elevation: 180 m (590 ft)
- Lowest elevation: 44 m (144 ft)
- Population (2023): 166
  - Density: 25.2/km^{2} (65.2/sq mi)
- Time zone: UTC+01:00 (CET)
  - Summer (DST): UTC+02:00 (CEST)
- INSEE/Postal code: 02797 /02160
- ^{1} French Land Register data, which excludes lakes, ponds, glaciers > 1 km^{2} (0.386 sq mi or 247 acres) and river estuaries.

Viel-Arcy is a commune in the Aisne department in Hauts-de-France in northern France.

== Population ==
Historical population
Year	Pop.	±% p.a.
1968	176	—
1975	153	−1.98%
1982	140	−1.26%
1990	131	−0.83%
1999	151	+1.59%
2007	175	+1.86%
2012	178	+0.34%
2017	179	+0.11%
2023	166	−1.25%
Source: INSEE

== See also ==
- Communes of the Aisne department
