= Villers-Agron-Aiguizy =

- Commune
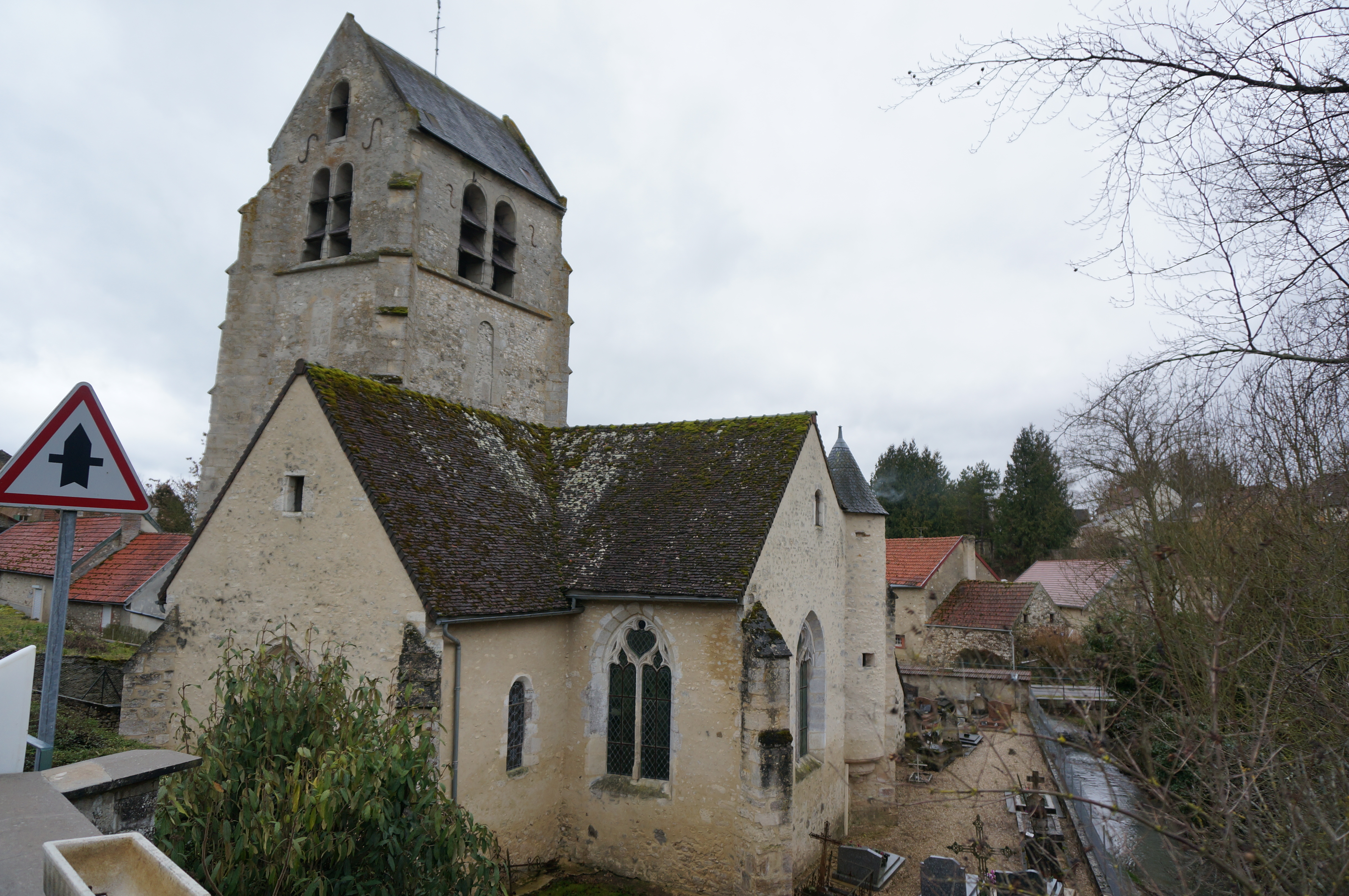
- The church of Villers-Agron-Aiguizy
- Location of Villers-Agron-Aiguizy
- Location within France Location within Hauts-de-France
- Coordinates: 49°09′44″N 3°41′55″E
- Country: France
- Region: Hauts-de-France
- Department: Aisne
- Arrondissement: Château-Thierry
- Canton: Fère-en-Tardenois
- Intercommunality: CA Région de Château-Thierry

Government
  - Mayor (2026–32): Jean-Claude Schires
- Area^{1}: 12.79 km^{2} (4.94 sq mi)
- Elevation: 128 m (420 ft)
- Highest elevation: 220 m (720 ft)
- Lowest elevation: 110 m (360 ft)
- Population (2023): 75
  - Density: 5.9/km^{2} (15/sq mi)
- Time zone: UTC+01:00 (CET)
  - Summer (DST): UTC+02:00 (CEST)
- INSEE/Postal code: 02809 /02130
- ^{1} French Land Register data, which excludes lakes, ponds, glaciers > 1 km^{2} (0.386 sq mi or 247 acres) and river estuaries.

Villers-Agron-Aiguizy (French pronunciation: [vilɛʁ aɡʁɔ̃ eɡizi]) is a commune in the Aisne department in Hauts-de-France in northern France.

== Population ==
Historical population
Year	Pop.	±% p.a.
1968	104	—
1975	90	−2.04%
1982	85	−0.81%
1990	80	−0.75%
1999	70	−1.47%
2007	94	+3.75%
2012	90	−0.87%
2017	74	−3.84%
2023	75	+0.22%
Source: INSEE

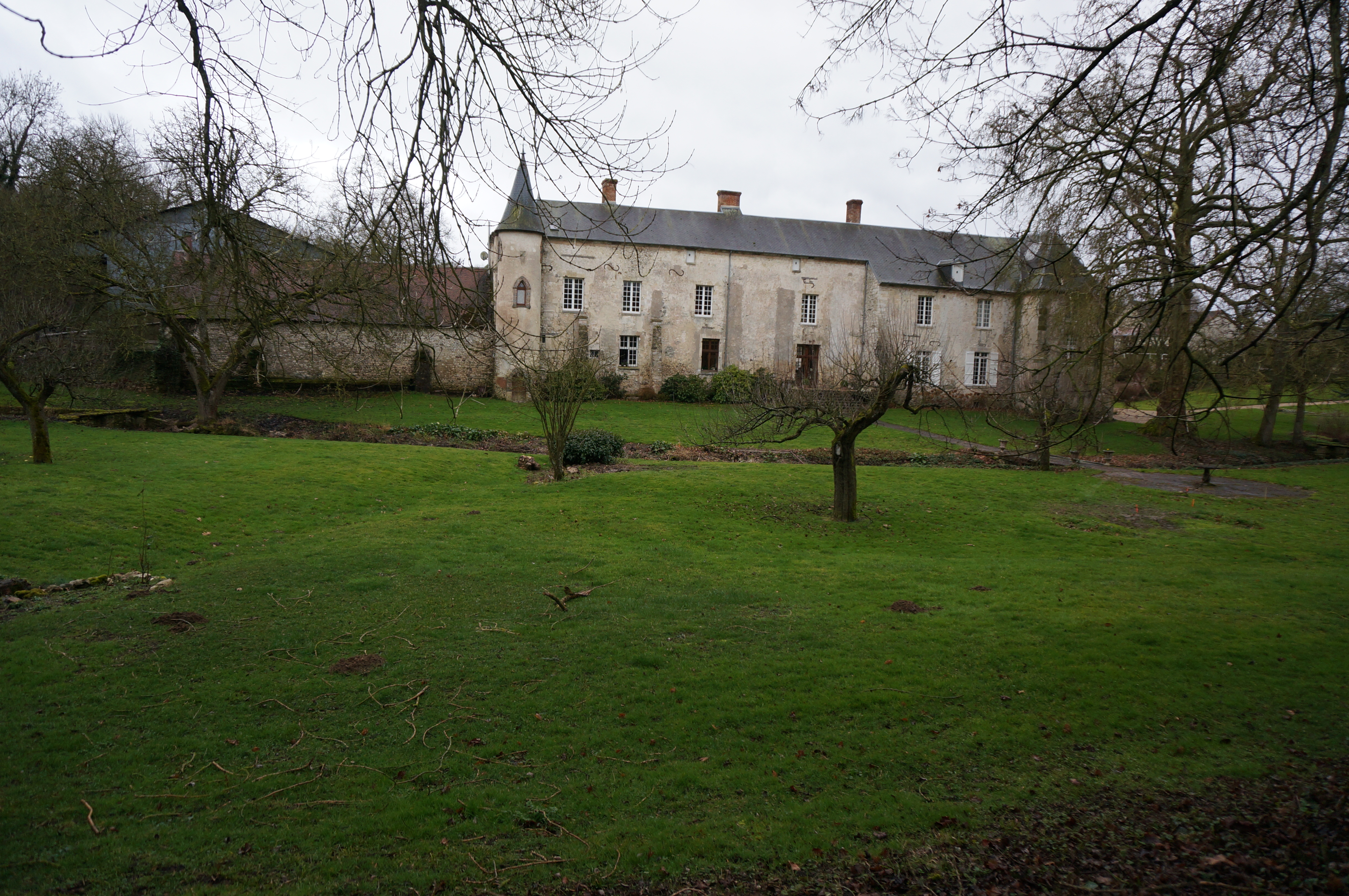
Golf

== See also ==
- Communes of the Aisne department
