= Dhuizel =

- Commune
- Location of Dhuizel
- Location within France Location within Hauts-de-France
- Coordinates: 49°21′58″N 3°37′09″E
- Country: France
- Region: Hauts-de-France
- Department: Aisne
- Arrondissement: Soissons
- Canton: Fère-en-Tardenois
- Intercommunality: Val de l'Aisne

Government
  - Mayor (2026–32): Corinne Lallier
- Area^{1}: 6.81 km^{2} (2.63 sq mi)
- Elevation: 80 m (260 ft)
- Highest elevation: 177 m (581 ft)
- Lowest elevation: 69 m (226 ft)
- Population (2023): 114
  - Density: 16.7/km^{2} (43.4/sq mi)
- Time zone: UTC+01:00 (CET)
  - Summer (DST): UTC+02:00 (CEST)
- INSEE/Postal code: 02263 /02220
- ^{1} French Land Register data, which excludes lakes, ponds, glaciers > 1 km^{2} (0.386 sq mi or 247 acres) and river estuaries.

Dhuizel (French pronunciation: [dɥizɛl]) is a commune in the Aisne department in Hauts-de-France in northern France.

== Population ==
Historical population
| Year | Pop. | ±% p.a. |
|---|---|---|
| 1968 | 153 | — |
| 1975 | 125 | −2.85% |
| 1982 | 103 | −2.73% |
| 1990 | 101 | −0.24% |
| 1999 | 102 | +0.11% |
| 2007 | 100 | −0.25% |
| 2012 | 116 | +3.01% |
| 2017 | 114 | −0.35% |
| 2023 | 114 | +0.00% |
Source: INSEE

== See also ==
- Communes of the Aisne department
