= Neuville-sur-Margival =

- Commune
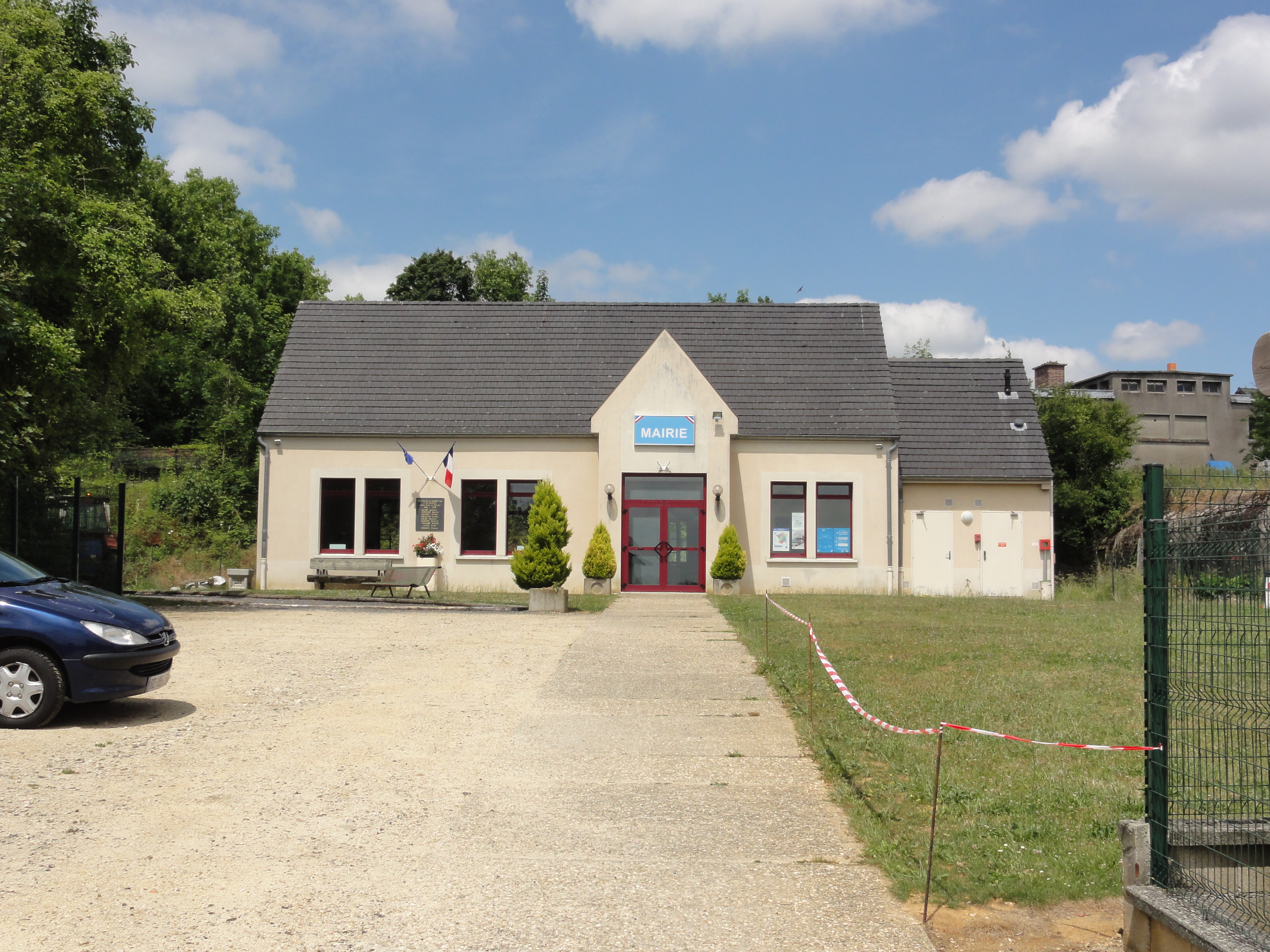
- The town hall of Neuville-sur-Margival
- Location of Neuville-sur-Margival
- Location within France Location within Hauts-de-France
- Coordinates: 49°27′12″N 3°24′04″E
- Country: France
- Region: Hauts-de-France
- Department: Aisne
- Arrondissement: Soissons
- Canton: Fère-en-Tardenois
- Intercommunality: Val de l'Aisne

Government
  - Mayor (2026–32): Laurent Leclercq
- Area^{1}: 3.65 km^{2} (1.41 sq mi)
- Elevation: 170 m (560 ft)
- Highest elevation: 161 m (528 ft)
- Lowest elevation: 73 m (240 ft)
- Population (2023): 116
  - Density: 31.8/km^{2} (82.3/sq mi)
- Time zone: UTC+01:00 (CET)
  - Summer (DST): UTC+02:00 (CEST)
- INSEE/Postal code: 02551 /02880
- ^{1} French Land Register data, which excludes lakes, ponds, glaciers > 1 km^{2} (0.386 sq mi or 247 acres) and river estuaries.

Neuville-sur-Margival (French pronunciation: [nøvil syʁ maʁʒival], literally Neuville on Margival) is a commune in the Aisne department in Hauts-de-France in northern France.

== Population ==
Historical population
| Year | Pop. | ±% p.a. |
|---|---|---|
| 1968 | 90 | — |
| 1975 | 83 | −1.15% |
| 1982 | 77 | −1.07% |
| 1990 | 58 | −3.48% |
| 1999 | 91 | +5.13% |
| 2007 | 110 | +2.40% |
| 2012 | 127 | +2.92% |
| 2017 | 117 | −1.63% |
| 2023 | 116 | −0.14% |
Source: INSEE

== See also ==
- Communes of the Aisne department
