= Saint-Mard, Aisne =

Saint-Mard
- Commune
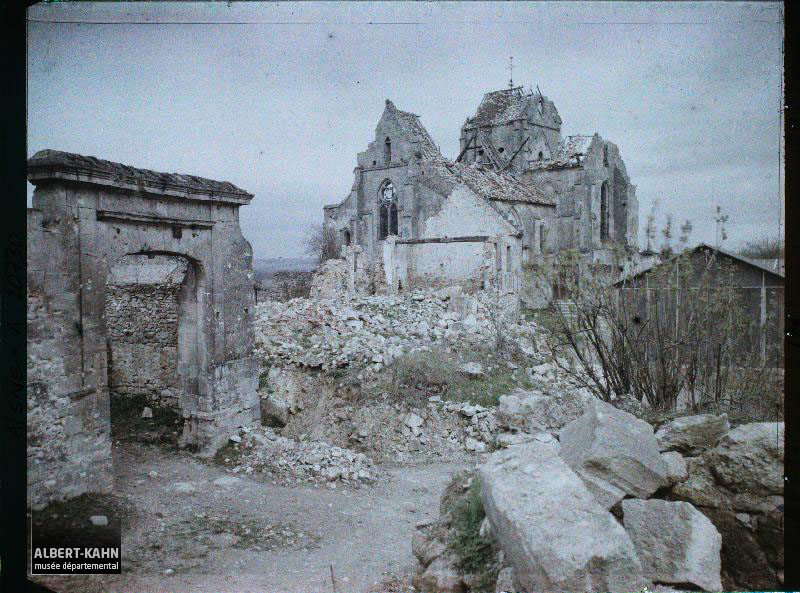
- The church of Saint-Mard after World War I

- Coat of arms
- Location of Saint-Mard
- Location within France Location within Hauts-de-France
- Coordinates: 49°23′14″N 3°35′03″E
- Country: France
- Region: Hauts-de-France
- Department: Aisne
- Arrondissement: Château-Thierry
- Canton: Fère-en-Tardenois
- Intercommunality: Val de l'Aisne

Government
  - Mayor (2026–32): Claude Jacquemin
- Area^{1}: 4.69 km^{2} (1.81 sq mi)
- Elevation: 142 m (466 ft)
- Highest elevation: 182 m (597 ft)
- Lowest elevation: 43 m (141 ft)
- Population (2023): 116
  - Density: 24.7/km^{2} (64.1/sq mi)
- Time zone: UTC+01:00 (CET)
  - Summer (DST): UTC+02:00 (CEST)
- INSEE/Postal code: 02682 /02220
- ^{1} French Land Register data, which excludes lakes, ponds, glaciers > 1 km^{2} (0.386 sq mi or 247 acres) and river estuaries.

Saint-Mard (French pronunciation: [sɛ̃ maʁ]) is a commune in the Aisne department in Hauts-de-France in northern France.

== Population ==
Historical population
Year	Pop.	±% p.a.
1968	123	—
1975	104	−2.37%
1982	81	−3.51%
1990	87	+0.90%
1999	113	+2.95%
2007	121	+0.86%
2012	107	−2.43%
2017	112	+0.92%
2023	116	+0.59%
Source: INSEE

== See also ==
- Communes of the Aisne department
