= Mareuil-en-Dôle =

- Commune
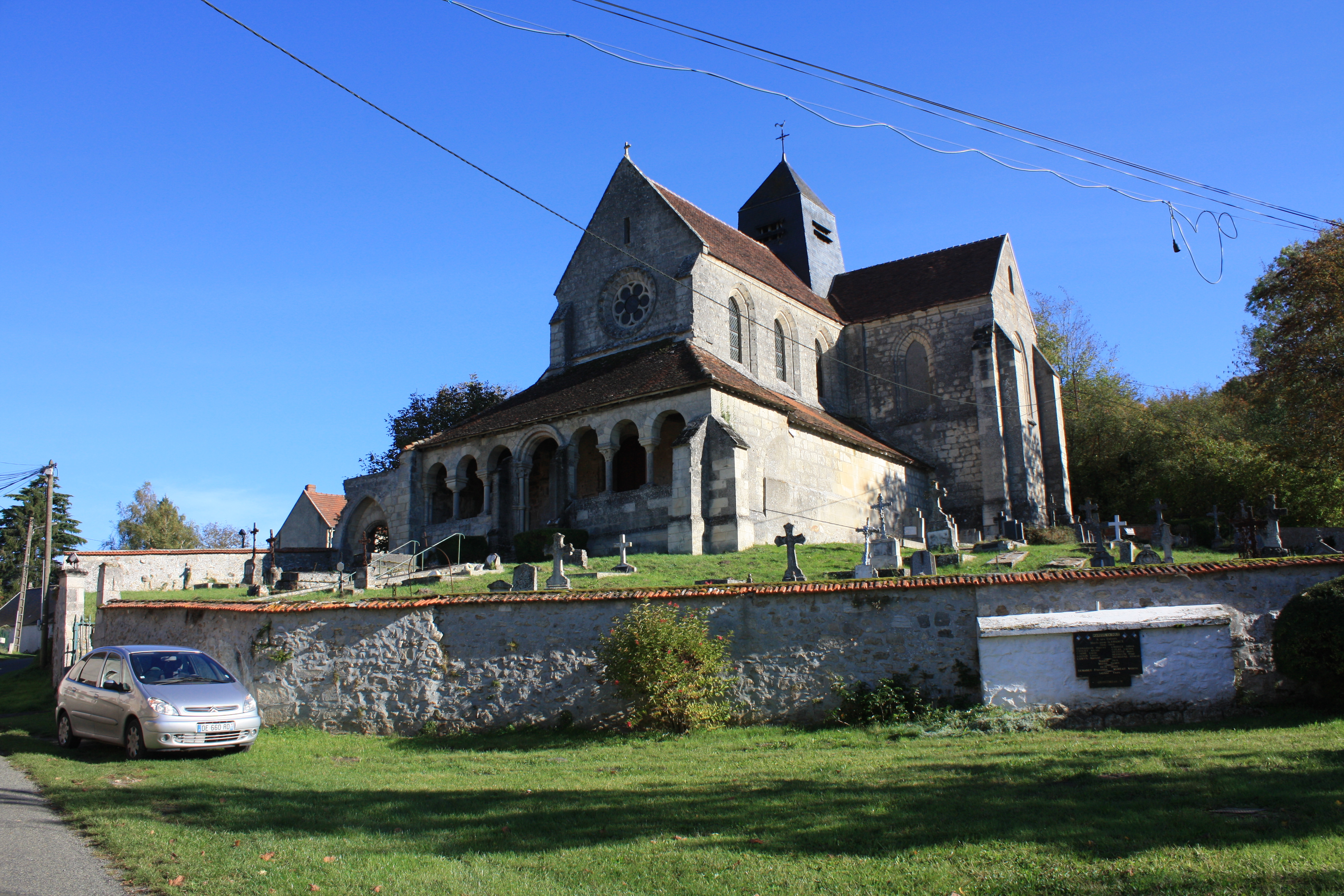
- The church of Mareuil-en-Dôle
- Location of Mareuil-en-Dôle
- Location within France Location within Hauts-de-France
- Coordinates: 49°14′30″N 3°33′27″E
- Country: France
- Region: Hauts-de-France
- Department: Aisne
- Arrondissement: Château-Thierry
- Canton: Fère-en-Tardenois
- Intercommunality: CA Région de Château-Thierry

Government
  - Mayor (2026–32): Régine Domingues
- Area^{1}: 8.81 km^{2} (3.40 sq mi)
- Elevation: 176 m (577 ft)
- Highest elevation: 203 m (666 ft)
- Lowest elevation: 73 m (240 ft)
- Population (2023): 221
  - Density: 25.1/km^{2} (65.0/sq mi)
- Time zone: UTC+01:00 (CET)
  - Summer (DST): UTC+02:00 (CEST)
- INSEE/Postal code: 02462 /02130
- ^{1} French Land Register data, which excludes lakes, ponds, glaciers > 1 km^{2} (0.386 sq mi or 247 acres) and river estuaries.

Mareuil-en-Dôle (French pronunciation: [maʁœj ɑ̃ dol]) is a commune in the Aisne department in Hauts-de-France in northern France.

== Population ==
Historical population
Year	Pop.	±% p.a.
1968	176	—
1975	148	−2.44%
1982	150	+0.19%
1990	181	+2.38%
1999	184	+0.18%
2007	218	+2.14%
2012	266	+4.06%
2017	240	−2.04%
2023	221	−1.37%
Source: INSEE

== See also ==
- Communes of the Aisne department
