= Bruyères-sur-Fère =

- Commune
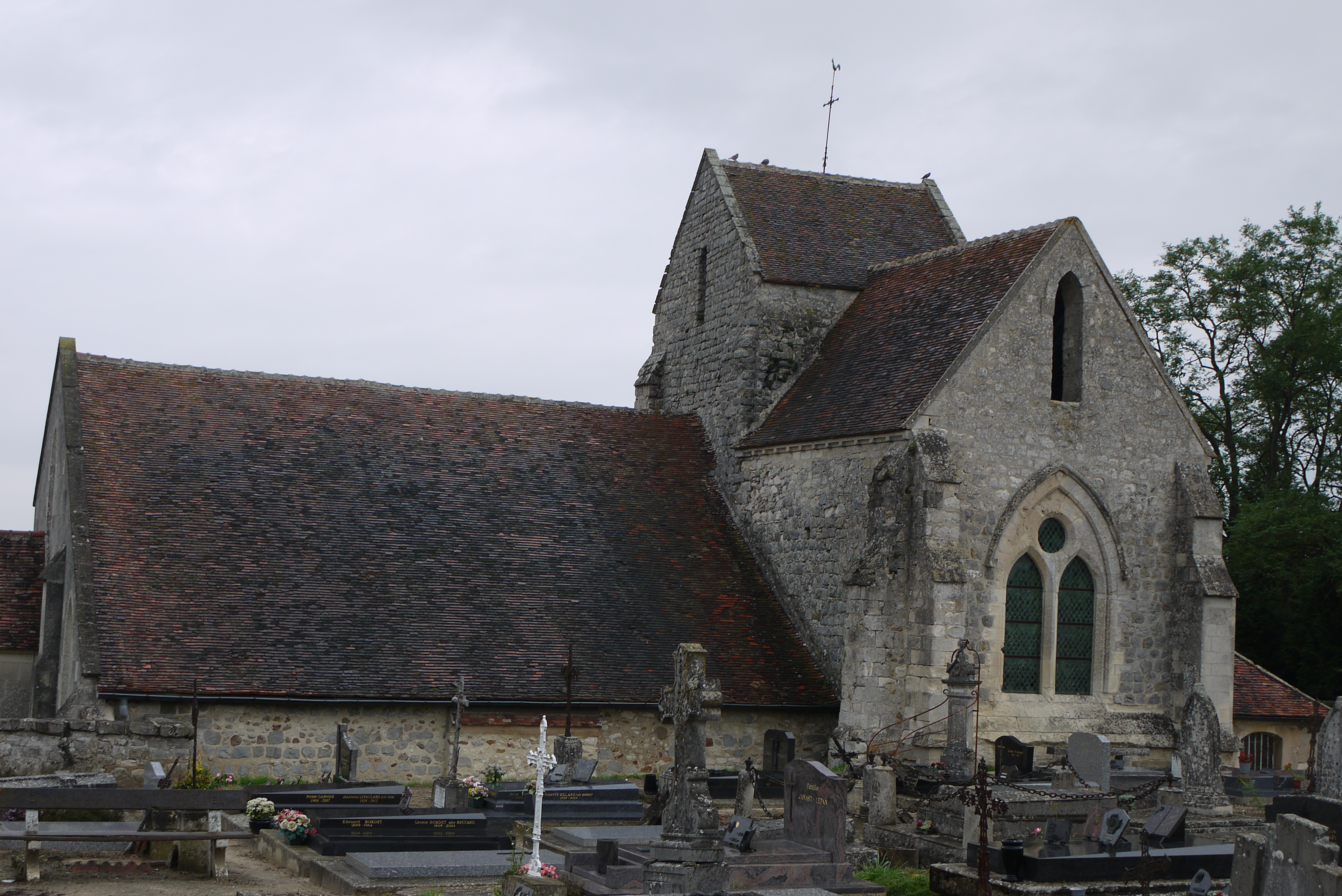
- The church of Bruyères-sur-Fère
- Location of Bruyères-sur-Fère
- Location within France Location within Hauts-de-France
- Coordinates: 49°11′25″N 3°26′36″E
- Country: France
- Region: Hauts-de-France
- Department: Aisne
- Arrondissement: Château-Thierry
- Canton: Fère-en-Tardenois
- Intercommunality: CA Région de Château-Thierry

Government
  - Mayor (2026–32): Fabien Fraeyman
- Area^{1}: 9.05 km^{2} (3.49 sq mi)
- Elevation: 136 m (446 ft)
- Highest elevation: 169 m (554 ft)
- Lowest elevation: 91 m (299 ft)
- Population (2023): 199
  - Density: 22.0/km^{2} (57.0/sq mi)
- Time zone: UTC+01:00 (CET)
  - Summer (DST): UTC+02:00 (CEST)
- INSEE/Postal code: 02127 /02130
- ^{1} French Land Register data, which excludes lakes, ponds, glaciers > 1 km^{2} (0.386 sq mi or 247 acres) and river estuaries.

Bruyères-sur-Fère (French pronunciation: [bʁɥijɛʁ syʁ fɛʁ], literally Bruyères on Fère) is a commune in the department of Aisne in Hauts-de-France in northern France.

== Population ==
Historical population
Year	Pop.	±% p.a.
1968	233	—
1975	224	−0.56%
1982	184	−2.77%
1990	213	+1.85%
1999	217	+0.21%
2007	209	−0.47%
2012	198	−1.08%
2017	189	−0.93%
2023	199	+0.86%
Source: INSEE

== See also ==
- Communes of the Aisne department
