= Paars =

- Commune
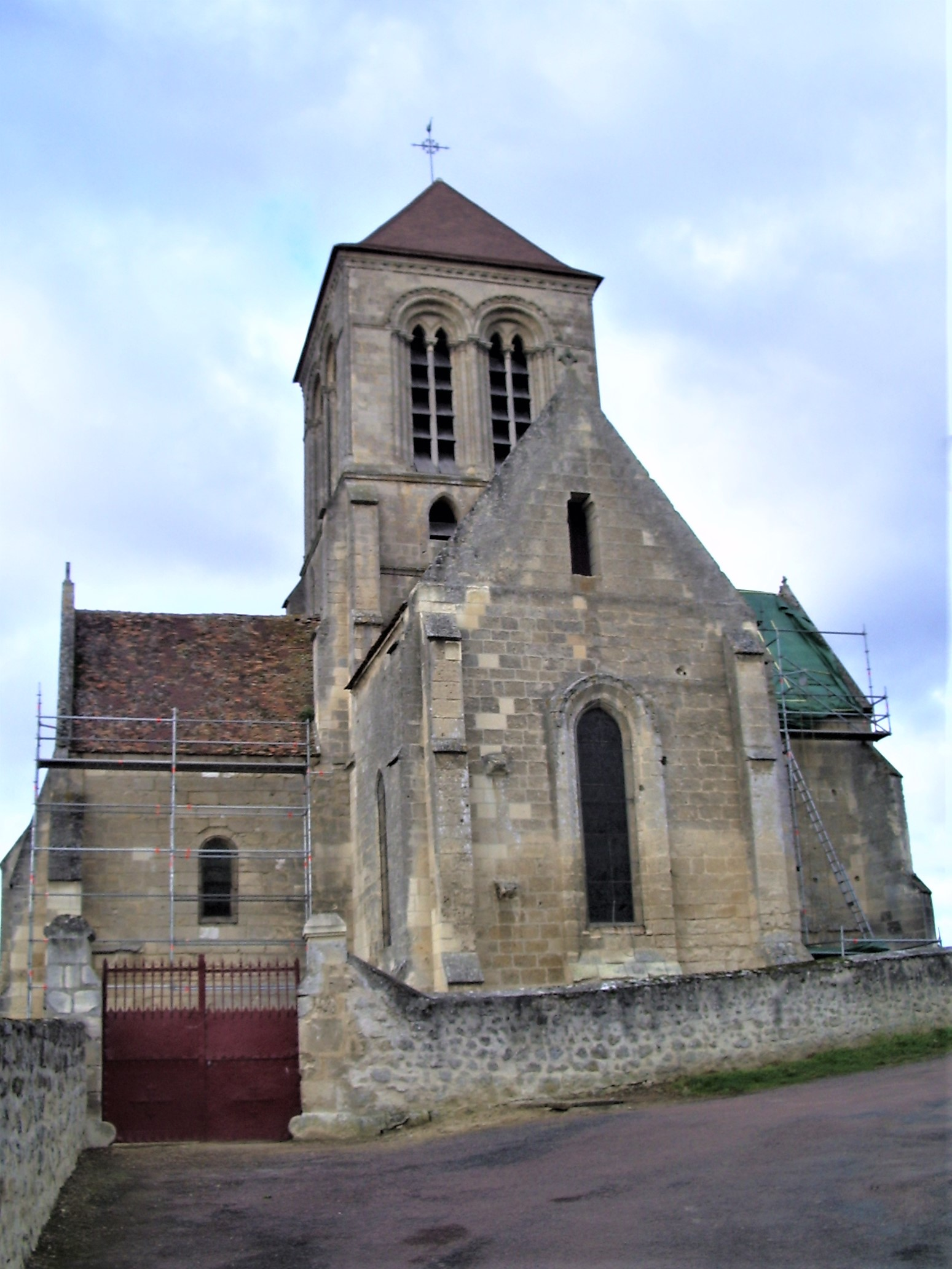
- The church of Paars

- Coat of arms
- Location of Paars
- Location within France Location within Hauts-de-France
- Coordinates: 49°19′45″N 3°36′05″E
- Country: France
- Region: Hauts-de-France
- Department: Aisne
- Arrondissement: Soissons
- Canton: Fère-en-Tardenois
- Intercommunality: Val de l'Aisne

Government
  - Mayor (2026–32): Thierry Vallée
- Area^{1}: 5.15 km^{2} (1.99 sq mi)
- Elevation: 90 m (300 ft)
- Highest elevation: 169 m (554 ft)
- Lowest elevation: 54 m (177 ft)
- Population (2023): 309
  - Density: 60.0/km^{2} (155/sq mi)
- Time zone: UTC+01:00 (CET)
  - Summer (DST): UTC+02:00 (CEST)
- INSEE/Postal code: 02581 /02220
- ^{1} French Land Register data, which excludes lakes, ponds, glaciers > 1 km^{2} (0.386 sq mi or 247 acres) and river estuaries.

Paars is a commune in the Aisne department in Hauts-de-France in northern France.

== Population ==
Historical population
| Year | Pop. | ±% p.a. |
|---|---|---|
| 1968 | 225 | — |
| 1975 | 213 | −0.78% |
| 1982 | 192 | −1.47% |
| 1990 | 180 | −0.80% |
| 1999 | 210 | +1.73% |
| 2007 | 259 | +2.66% |
| 2012 | 297 | +2.78% |
| 2017 | 314 | +1.12% |
| 2023 | 309 | −0.27% |
Source: INSEE

== See also ==
- Communes of the Aisne department
