= Quincy-sous-le-Mont =

- Commune
- Location of Quincy-sous-le-Mont
- Location within France Location within Hauts-de-France
- Coordinates: 49°18′24″N 3°33′10″E
- Country: France
- Region: Hauts-de-France
- Department: Aisne
- Arrondissement: Soissons
- Canton: Fère-en-Tardenois
- Intercommunality: Val de l'Aisne

Government
  - Mayor (2026–32): Marc Domissy
- Area^{1}: 5.04 km^{2} (1.95 sq mi)
- Elevation: 78 m (256 ft)
- Highest elevation: 137 m (449 ft)
- Lowest elevation: 53 m (174 ft)
- Population (2023): 62
  - Density: 12/km^{2} (32/sq mi)
- Time zone: UTC+01:00 (CET)
  - Summer (DST): UTC+02:00 (CEST)
- INSEE/Postal code: 02633 /02220
- ^{1} French Land Register data, which excludes lakes, ponds, glaciers > 1 km^{2} (0.386 sq mi or 247 acres) and river estuaries.

Quincy-sous-le-Mont (French pronunciation: [kɛ̃si su lə mɔ̃]) is a commune in the Aisne department in Hauts-de-France in northern France.

== Population ==
Historical population
Year	Pop.	±% p.a.
1968	80	—
1975	58	−4.49%
1982	40	−5.17%
1990	37	−0.97%
1999	52	+3.85%
2007	66	+3.02%
2012	65	−0.30%
2017	61	−1.26%
2023	62	+0.27%
Source: INSEE

== See also ==
- Communes of the Aisne department
