= Lhuys =

- Commune
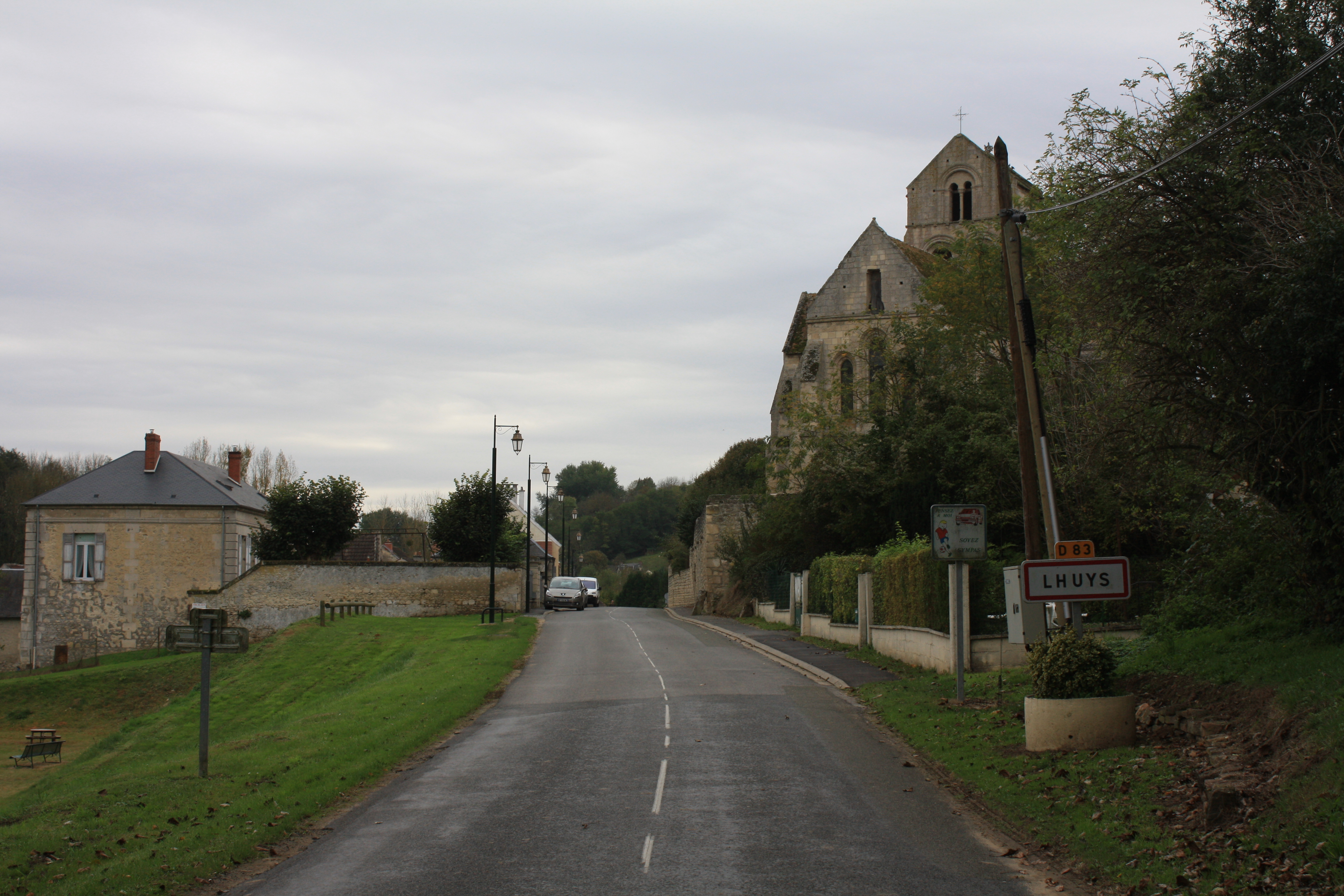
- The road into Luys

- Coat of arms
- Location of Lhuys
- Location within France Location within Hauts-de-France
- Coordinates: 49°16′53″N 3°33′20″E
- Country: France
- Region: Hauts-de-France
- Department: Aisne
- Arrondissement: Soissons
- Canton: Fère-en-Tardenois
- Intercommunality: Val de l'Aisne

Government
  - Mayor (2026–32): Alain Seve
- Area^{1}: 4.95 km^{2} (1.91 sq mi)
- Elevation: 81 m (266 ft)
- Highest elevation: 146 m (479 ft)
- Lowest elevation: 67 m (220 ft)
- Population (2023): 140
  - Density: 28/km^{2} (73/sq mi)
- Time zone: UTC+01:00 (CET)
  - Summer (DST): UTC+02:00 (CEST)
- INSEE/Postal code: 02427 /02220
- ^{1} French Land Register data, which excludes lakes, ponds, glaciers > 1 km^{2} (0.386 sq mi or 247 acres) and river estuaries.

Lhuys is a commune in the Aisne department in Hauts-de-France in northern France.

== Population ==
Historical population
Year	Pop.	±% p.a.
1968	122	—
1975	106	−1.99%
1982	77	−4.46%
1990	106	+4.08%
1999	115	+0.91%
2007	140	+2.49%
2012	149	+1.25%
2017	141	−1.10%
2023	140	−0.12%
Source: INSEE

== See also ==
- Communes of the Aisne department
