= Bruys =

- Commune
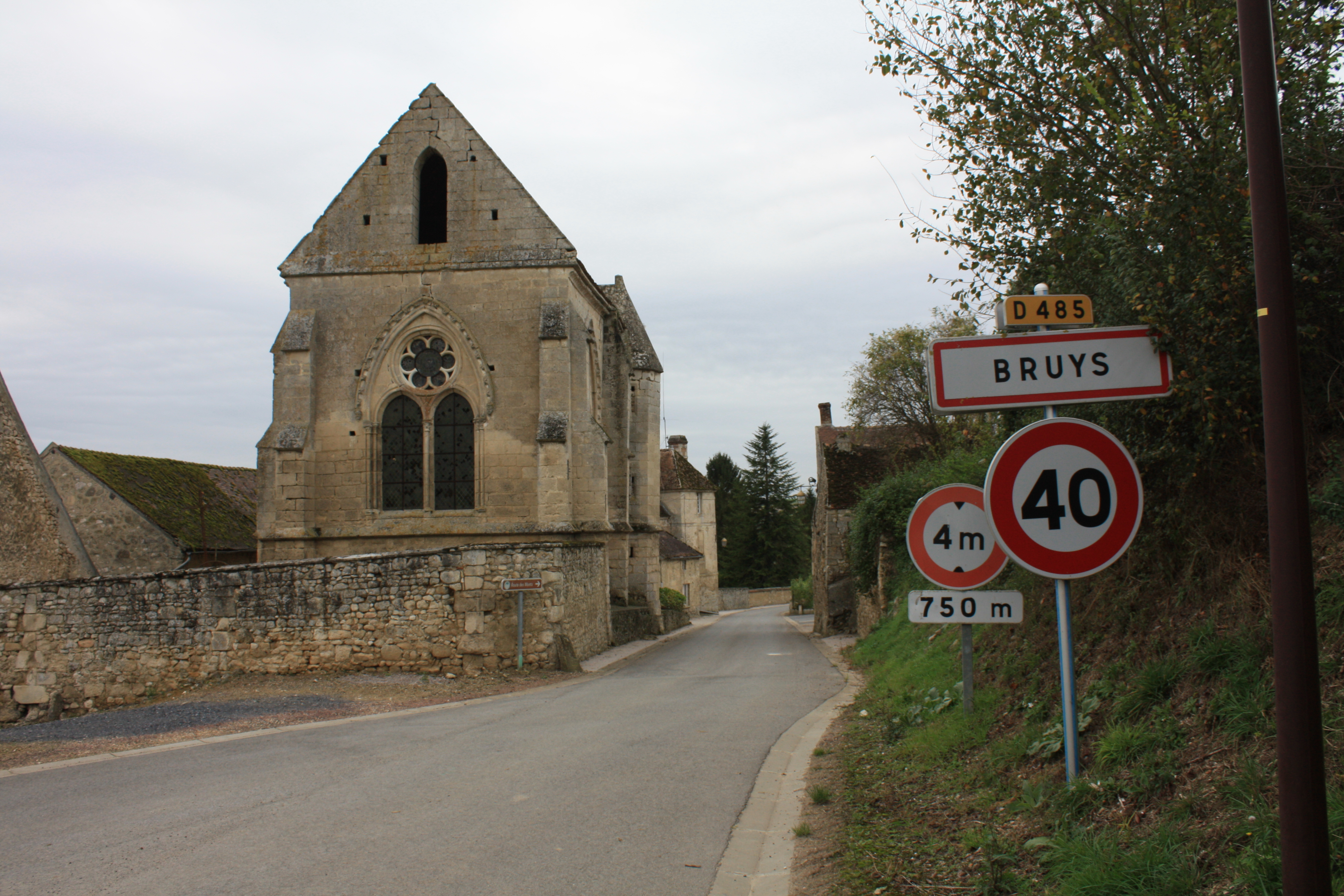
- The church of Bruys
- Location of Bruys
- Location within France Location within Hauts-de-France
- Coordinates: 49°16′17″N 3°33′50″E
- Country: France
- Region: Hauts-de-France
- Department: Aisne
- Arrondissement: Soissons
- Canton: Fère-en-Tardenois
- Intercommunality: Val de l'Aisne

Government
  - Mayor (2026–32): Guillaume Prevost
- Area^{1}: 5.7 km^{2} (2.2 sq mi)
- Elevation: 120 m (390 ft)
- Highest elevation: 188 m (617 ft)
- Lowest elevation: 72 m (236 ft)
- Population (2023): 20
  - Density: 3.5/km^{2} (9.1/sq mi)
- Time zone: UTC+01:00 (CET)
  - Summer (DST): UTC+02:00 (CEST)
- INSEE/Postal code: 02129 /02220
- ^{1} French Land Register data, which excludes lakes, ponds, glaciers > 1 km^{2} (0.386 sq mi or 247 acres) and river estuaries.

Bruys is a commune in the department of Aisne in Hauts-de-France in northern France.

== Population ==
Historical population
Year	Pop.	±% p.a.
1968	46	—
1975	37	−3.06%
1982	31	−2.50%
1990	26	−2.17%
1999	19	−3.43%
2007	20	+0.64%
2012	20	+0.00%
2017	19	−1.02%
2023	20	+0.86%
Source: INSEE

With a population of only 20 in 2023, Bruys is the 2nd least populated commune in the department of Aisne.

== See also ==
- Communes of the Aisne department
