= Cerseuil =

- Commune
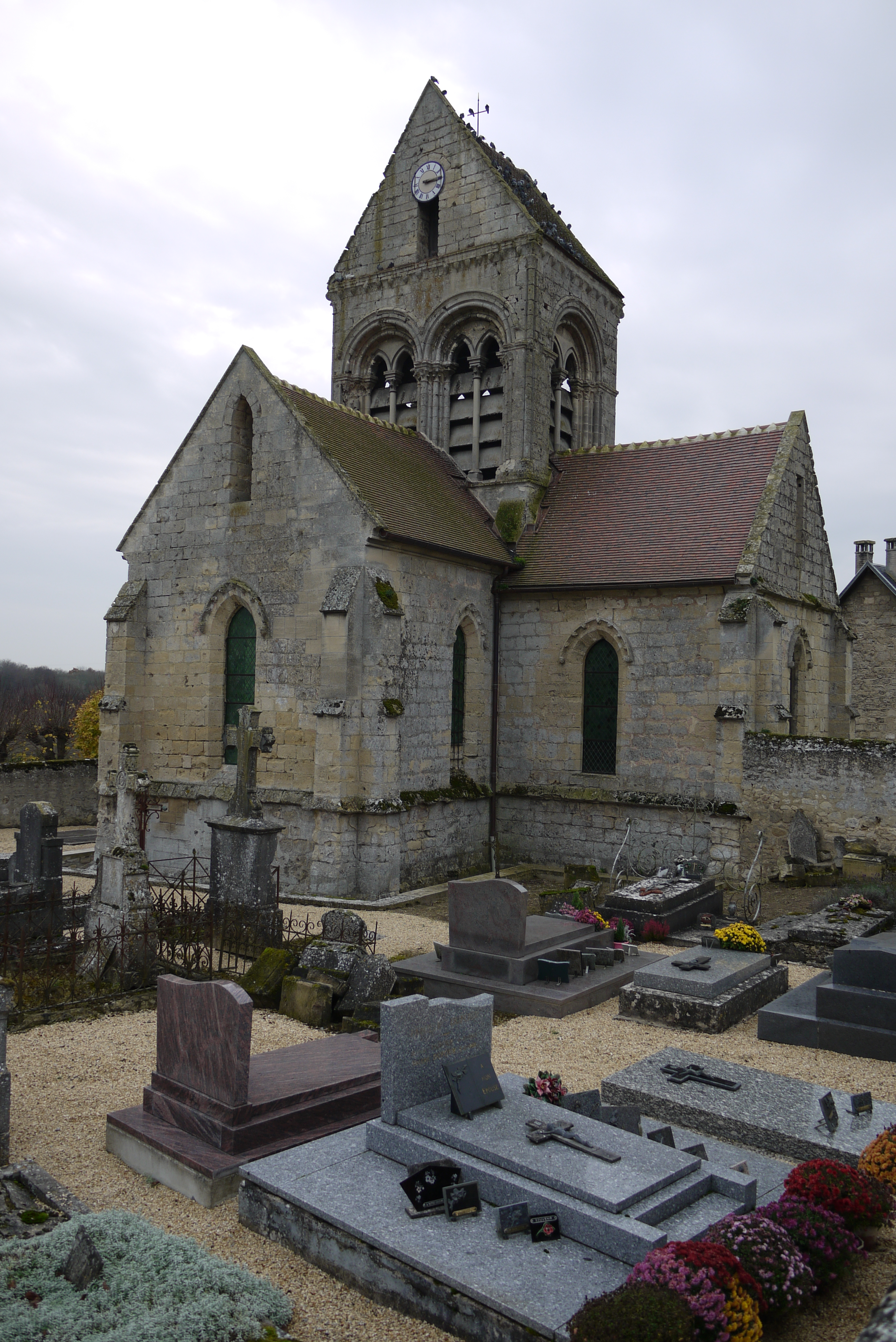
- The church
- Location of Cerseuil
- Location within France Location within Hauts-de-France
- Coordinates: 49°19′27″N 3°31′20″E
- Country: France
- Region: Hauts-de-France
- Department: Aisne
- Arrondissement: Soissons
- Canton: Fère-en-Tardenois
- Intercommunality: Val de l'Aisne

Government
  - Mayor (2026–32): Jacques Guyot
- Area^{1}: 4.61 km^{2} (1.78 sq mi)
- Elevation: 190 m (620 ft)
- Highest elevation: 159 m (522 ft)
- Lowest elevation: 65 m (213 ft)
- Population (2023): 87
  - Density: 19/km^{2} (49/sq mi)
- Time zone: UTC+01:00 (CET)
  - Summer (DST): UTC+02:00 (CEST)
- INSEE/Postal code: 02152 /02220
- ^{1} French Land Register data, which excludes lakes, ponds, glaciers > 1 km^{2} (0.386 sq mi or 247 acres) and river estuaries.

Cerseuil (French pronunciation: [sɛʁsœj]) is a commune in the Aisne department in Hauts-de-France in northern France.

== Population ==
Historical population
Year	Pop.	±% p.a.
1968	81	—
1975	67	−2.67%
1982	71	+0.83%
1990	72	+0.17%
1999	80	+1.18%
2007	86	+0.91%
2012	92	+1.36%
2017	89	−0.66%
2023	87	−0.38%
Source: INSEE

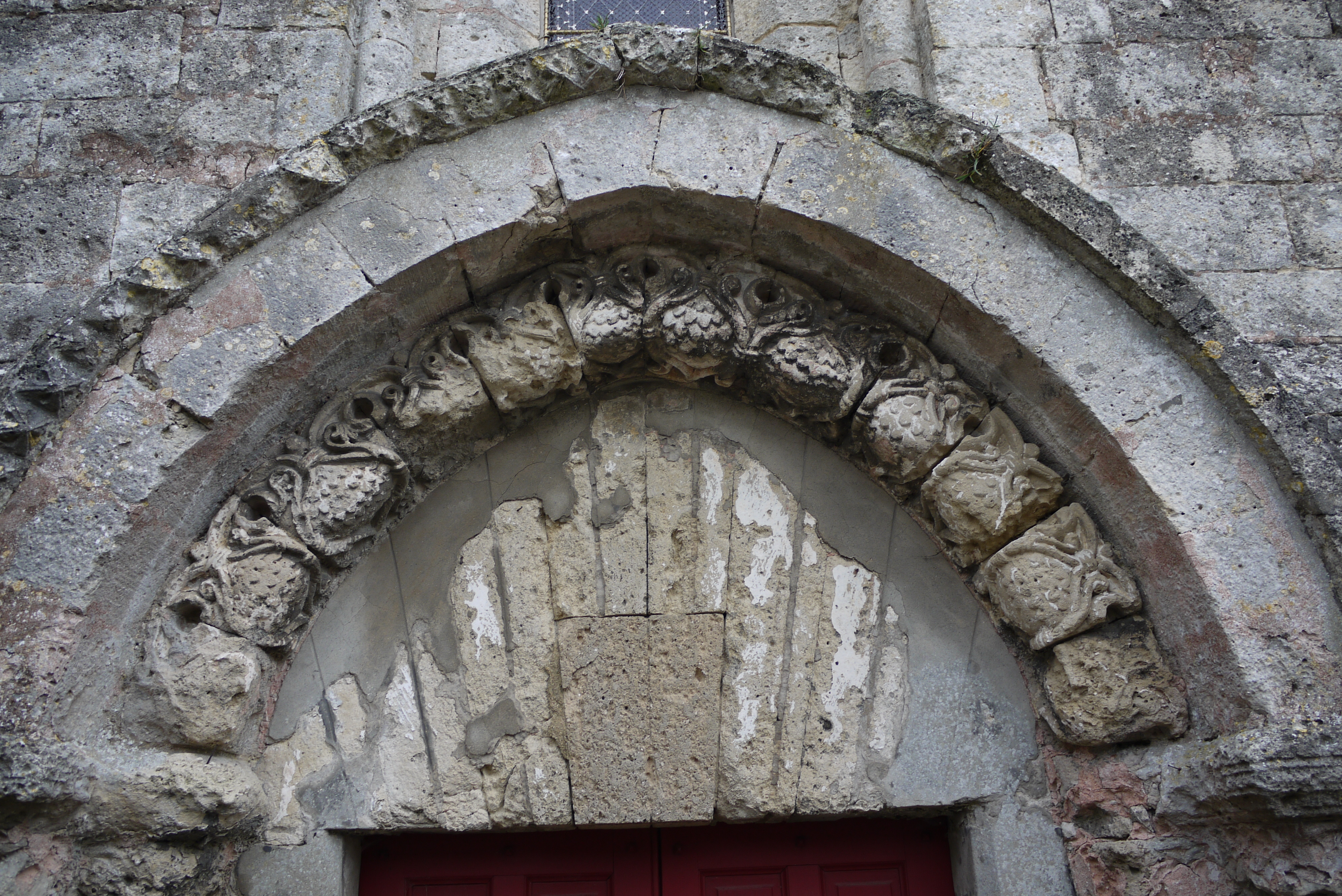
The arch of the portal of the church

== See also ==
- Communes of the Aisne department
