= Presles-et-Boves =

- Commune
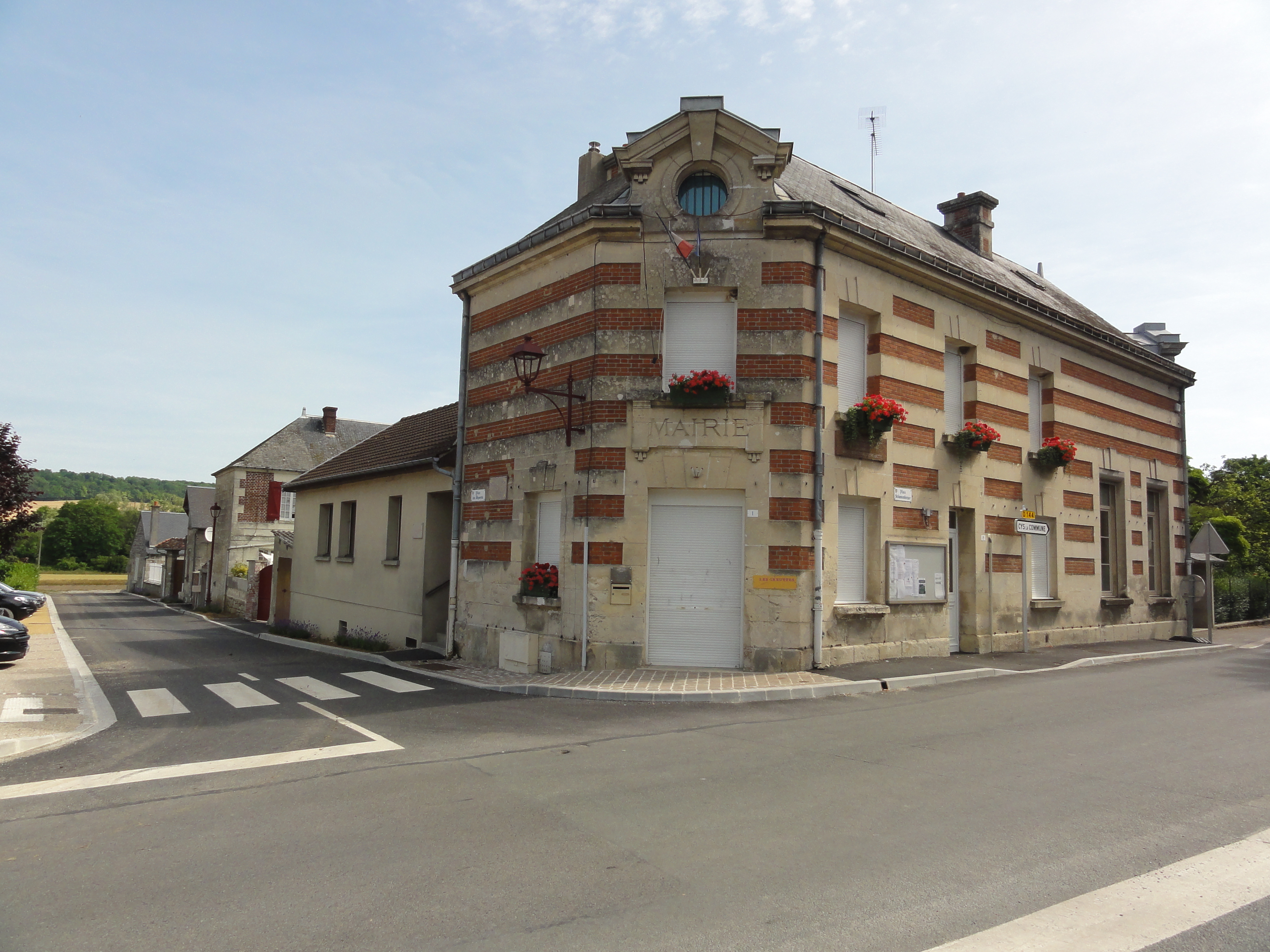
- The town hall of Presles-et-Boves
- Location of Presles-et-Boves
- Location within France Location within Hauts-de-France
- Coordinates: 49°23′38″N 3°33′36″E
- Country: France
- Region: Hauts-de-France
- Department: Aisne
- Arrondissement: Soissons
- Canton: Fère-en-Tardenois
- Intercommunality: Val de l'Aisne

Government
  - Mayor (2026–32): Maurice Delaître
- Area^{1}: 9.61 km^{2} (3.71 sq mi)
- Elevation: 55 m (180 ft)
- Highest elevation: 174 m (571 ft)
- Lowest elevation: 42 m (138 ft)
- Population (2023): 320
  - Density: 33/km^{2} (86/sq mi)
- Time zone: UTC+01:00 (CET)
  - Summer (DST): UTC+02:00 (CEST)
- INSEE/Postal code: 02620 /02370
- ^{1} French Land Register data, which excludes lakes, ponds, glaciers > 1 km^{2} (0.386 sq mi or 247 acres) and river estuaries.

Presles-et-Boves (French pronunciation: [pʁɛl e bɔv], lit. 'Presles and Boves') is a commune in the Aisne department in Hauts-de-France in northern France.

== Population ==
Historical population
Year	Pop.	±% p.a.
1968	273	—
1975	333	+2.88%
1982	330	−0.13%
1990	347	+0.63%
1999	343	−0.13%
2007	356	+0.47%
2012	369	+0.72%
2017	360	−0.49%
2023	320	−1.94%
Source: INSEE

== See also ==
- Communes of the Aisne department
