= Couvrelles =

- Commune
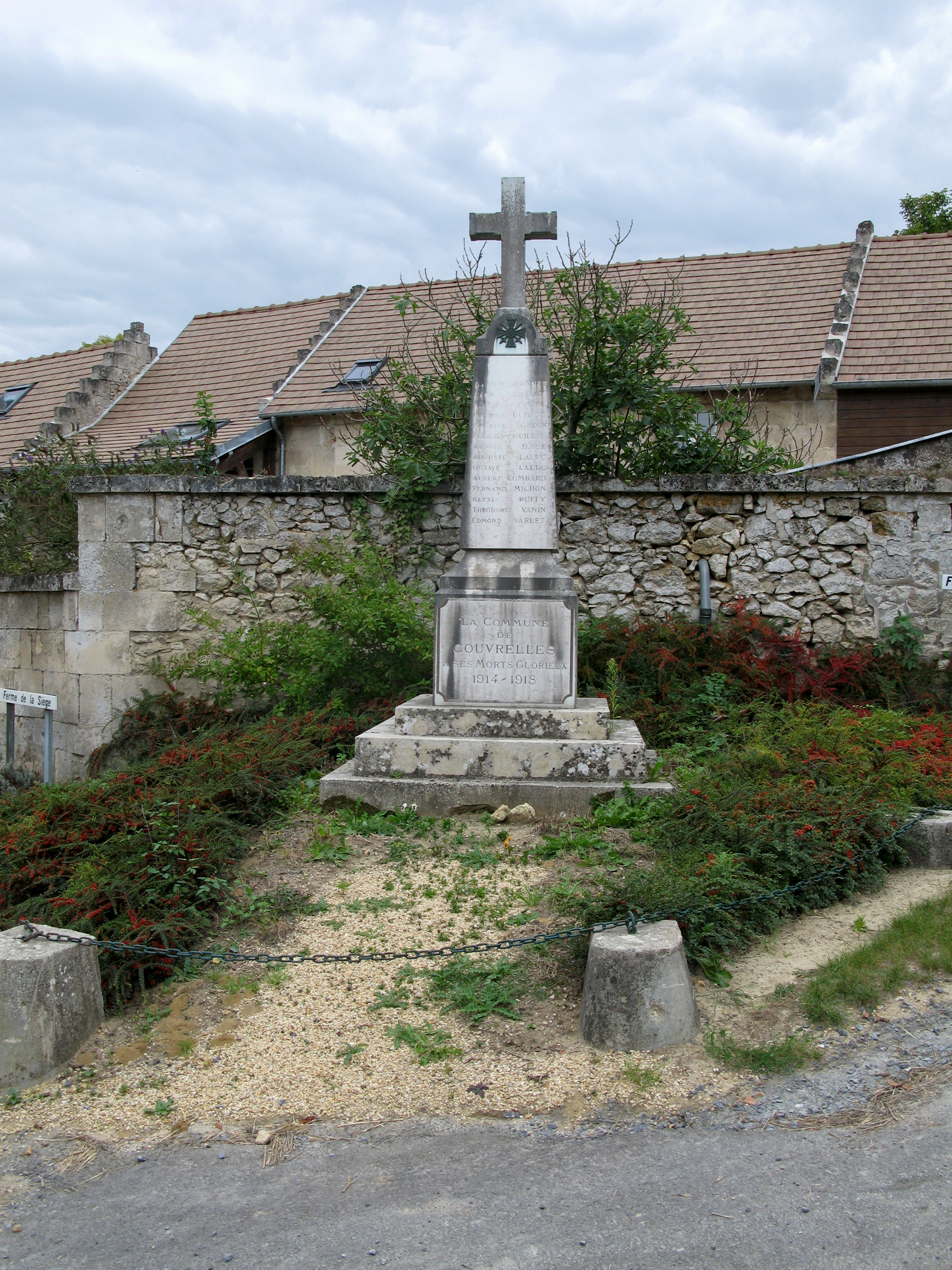
- War memorial
- Location of Couvrelles
- Location within France Location within Hauts-de-France
- Coordinates: 49°20′20″N 3°29′19″E
- Country: France
- Region: Hauts-de-France
- Department: Aisne
- Arrondissement: Soissons
- Canton: Fère-en-Tardenois
- Intercommunality: Val de l'Aisne

Government
  - Mayor (2026–32): Sabine Ometynck
- Area^{1}: 7.5 km^{2} (2.9 sq mi)
- Elevation: 75 m (246 ft)
- Highest elevation: 171 m (561 ft)
- Lowest elevation: 51 m (167 ft)
- Population (2023): 174
  - Density: 23/km^{2} (60/sq mi)
- Time zone: UTC+01:00 (CET)
  - Summer (DST): UTC+02:00 (CEST)
- INSEE/Postal code: 02230 /02220
- ^{1} French Land Register data, which excludes lakes, ponds, glaciers > 1 km^{2} (0.386 sq mi or 247 acres) and river estuaries.

Couvrelles (French pronunciation: [kuvʁɛl]) is a commune in the Aisne department in Hauts-de-France in northern France.

== Population ==
Historical population
Year	Pop.	±% p.a.
1968	180	—
1975	161	−1.58%
1982	180	+1.61%
1990	170	−0.71%
1999	190	+1.24%
2007	194	+0.26%
2012	193	−0.10%
2017	188	−0.52%
2023	174	−1.28%
Source: INSEE

== See also ==
- Communes of the Aisne department
