= Mont-Saint-Martin, Aisne =

Mont-Saint-Martin
- Commune
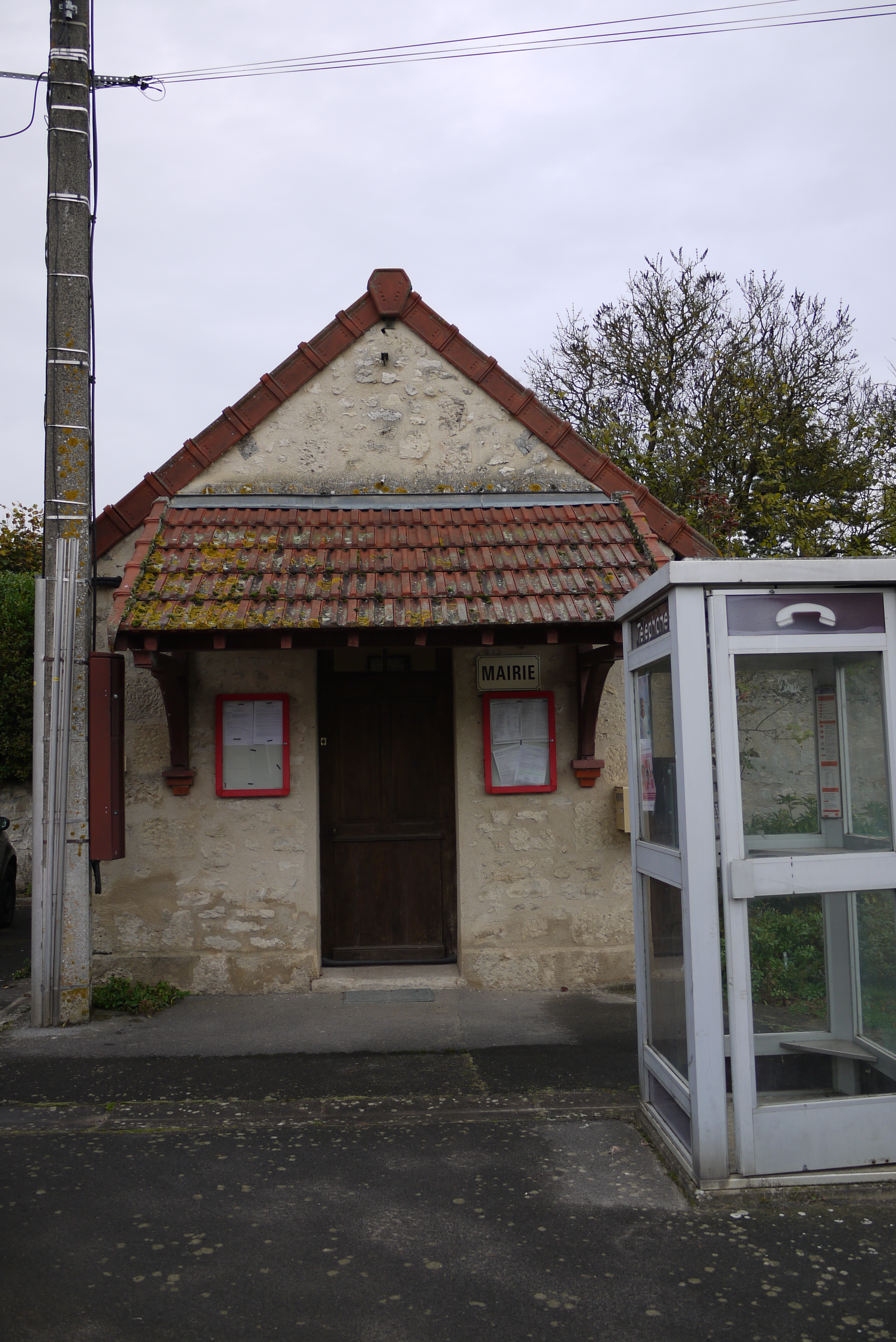
- The town hall of Mont-Saint-Martin
- Location of Mont-Saint-Martin
- Location within France Location within Hauts-de-France
- Coordinates: 49°17′00″N 3°38′28″E
- Country: France
- Region: Hauts-de-France
- Department: Aisne
- Arrondissement: Soissons
- Canton: Fère-en-Tardenois
- Intercommunality: Val de l'Aisne

Government
  - Mayor (2026–32): Grégory Besonhe
- Area^{1}: 5.81 km^{2} (2.24 sq mi)
- Highest elevation: 208 m (682 ft)
- Lowest elevation: 73 m (240 ft)
- Population (2023): 70
  - Density: 12/km^{2} (31/sq mi)
- Time zone: UTC+01:00 (CET)
  - Summer (DST): UTC+02:00 (CEST)
- INSEE/Postal code: 02523 /02220
- ^{1} French Land Register data, which excludes lakes, ponds, glaciers > 1 km^{2} (0.386 sq mi or 247 acres) and river estuaries.

Mont-Saint-Martin (French pronunciation: [mɔ̃ sɛ̃ maʁtɛ̃]) is a commune in the Aisne department in Hauts-de-France in northern France.

== Population ==
Historical population
Year	Pop.	±% p.a.
1968	71	—
1975	56	−3.33%
1982	56	+0.00%
1990	37	−5.05%
1999	40	+0.87%
2007	61	+5.42%
2012	85	+6.86%
2017	74	−2.73%
2023	70	−0.92%
Source: INSEE

== See also ==
- Communes of the Aisne department
