= Courmont, Aisne =

Courmont
- Commune
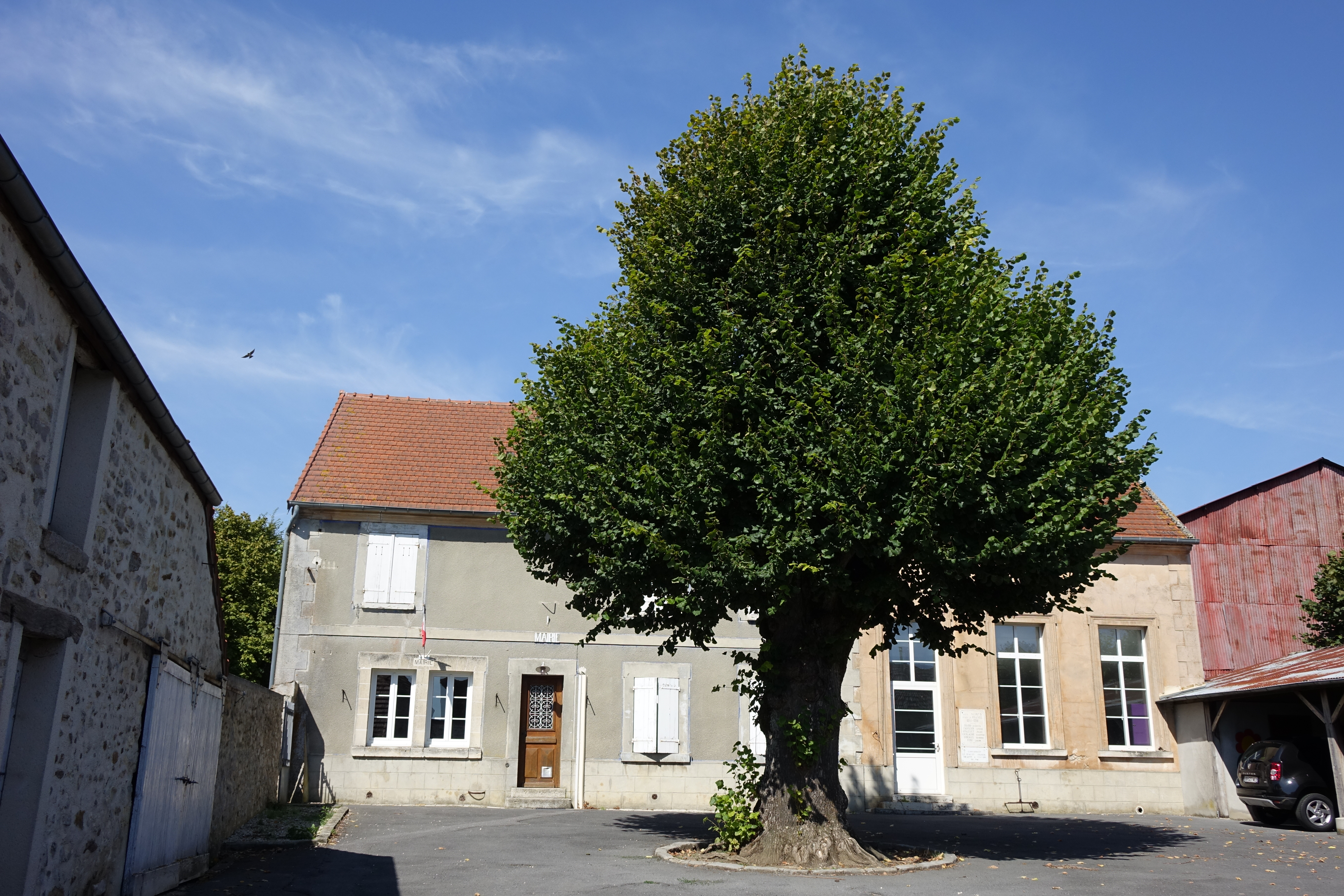
- The town hall of Courmont
- Location of Courmont
- Location within France Location within Hauts-de-France
- Coordinates: 49°08′57″N 3°34′36″E
- Country: France
- Region: Hauts-de-France
- Department: Aisne
- Arrondissement: Château-Thierry
- Canton: Fère-en-Tardenois
- Intercommunality: CA Région de Château-Thierry

Government
  - Mayor (2026–32): Régis Dujon
- Area^{1}: 9.86 km^{2} (3.81 sq mi)
- Elevation: 173 m (568 ft)
- Highest elevation: 227 m (745 ft)
- Lowest elevation: 139 m (456 ft)
- Population (2023): 126
  - Density: 12.8/km^{2} (33.1/sq mi)
- Time zone: UTC+01:00 (CET)
  - Summer (DST): UTC+02:00 (CEST)
- INSEE/Postal code: 02227 /02130
- ^{1} French Land Register data, which excludes lakes, ponds, glaciers > 1 km^{2} (0.386 sq mi or 247 acres) and river estuaries.

Courmont (French pronunciation: [kuʁmɔ̃]) is a commune in the Aisne department in Hauts-de-France in northern France.

== Population ==
Historical population
Year	Pop.	±% p.a.
1968	137	—
1975	133	−0.42%
1982	113	−2.30%
1990	106	−0.80%
1999	113	+0.71%
2007	111	−0.22%
2012	118	+1.23%
2017	133	+2.42%
2023	126	−0.90%
Source: INSEE

== See also ==
- Communes of the Aisne department
