= Lesges =

- Commune
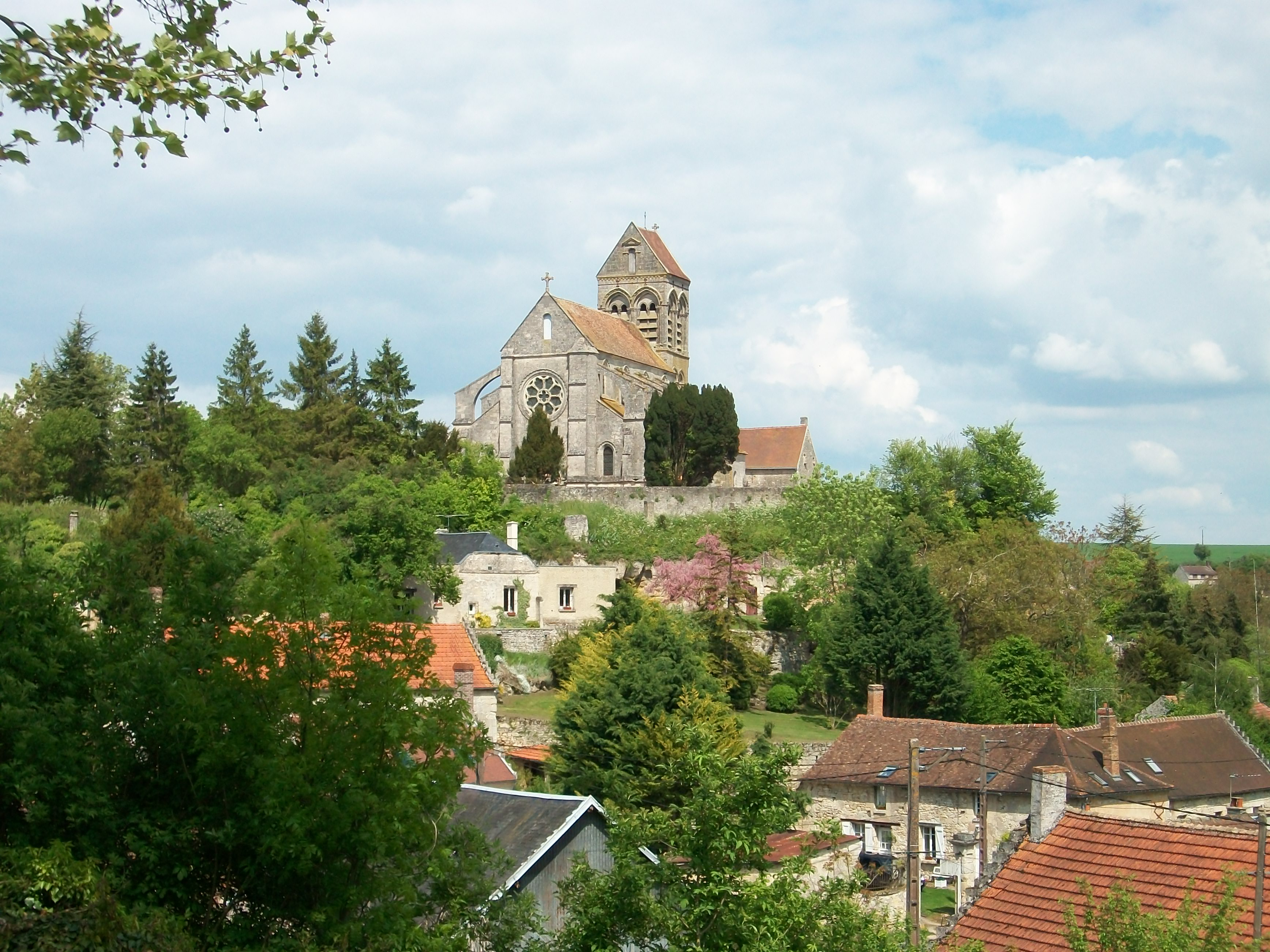
- The village and church of Lesges
- Location of Lesges
- Location within France Location within Hauts-de-France
- Coordinates: 49°18′26″N 3°30′28″E
- Country: France
- Region: Hauts-de-France
- Department: Aisne
- Arrondissement: Soissons
- Canton: Fère-en-Tardenois
- Intercommunality: Val de l'Aisne

Government
  - Mayor (2026–32): Jérôme Chauvin
- Area^{1}: 6.65 km^{2} (2.57 sq mi)
- Elevation: 100 m (330 ft)
- Highest elevation: 153 m (502 ft)
- Lowest elevation: 75 m (246 ft)
- Population (2023): 83
  - Density: 12/km^{2} (32/sq mi)
- Time zone: UTC+01:00 (CET)
  - Summer (DST): UTC+02:00 (CEST)
- INSEE/Postal code: 02421 /02220
- ^{1} French Land Register data, which excludes lakes, ponds, glaciers > 1 km^{2} (0.386 sq mi or 247 acres) and river estuaries.

Lesges (French pronunciation: [lɛʒ]) is a commune in the Aisne department in Hauts-de-France in northern France.

== Population ==
Historical population
Year	Pop.	±% p.a.
1968	85	—
1975	92	+1.14%
1982	77	−2.51%
1990	84	+1.09%
1999	81	−0.40%
2007	83	+0.31%
2012	82	−0.24%
2017	102	+4.46%
2023	83	−3.38%
Source: INSEE

== See also ==
- Communes of the Aisne department
