= Ciry-Salsogne =

- Commune
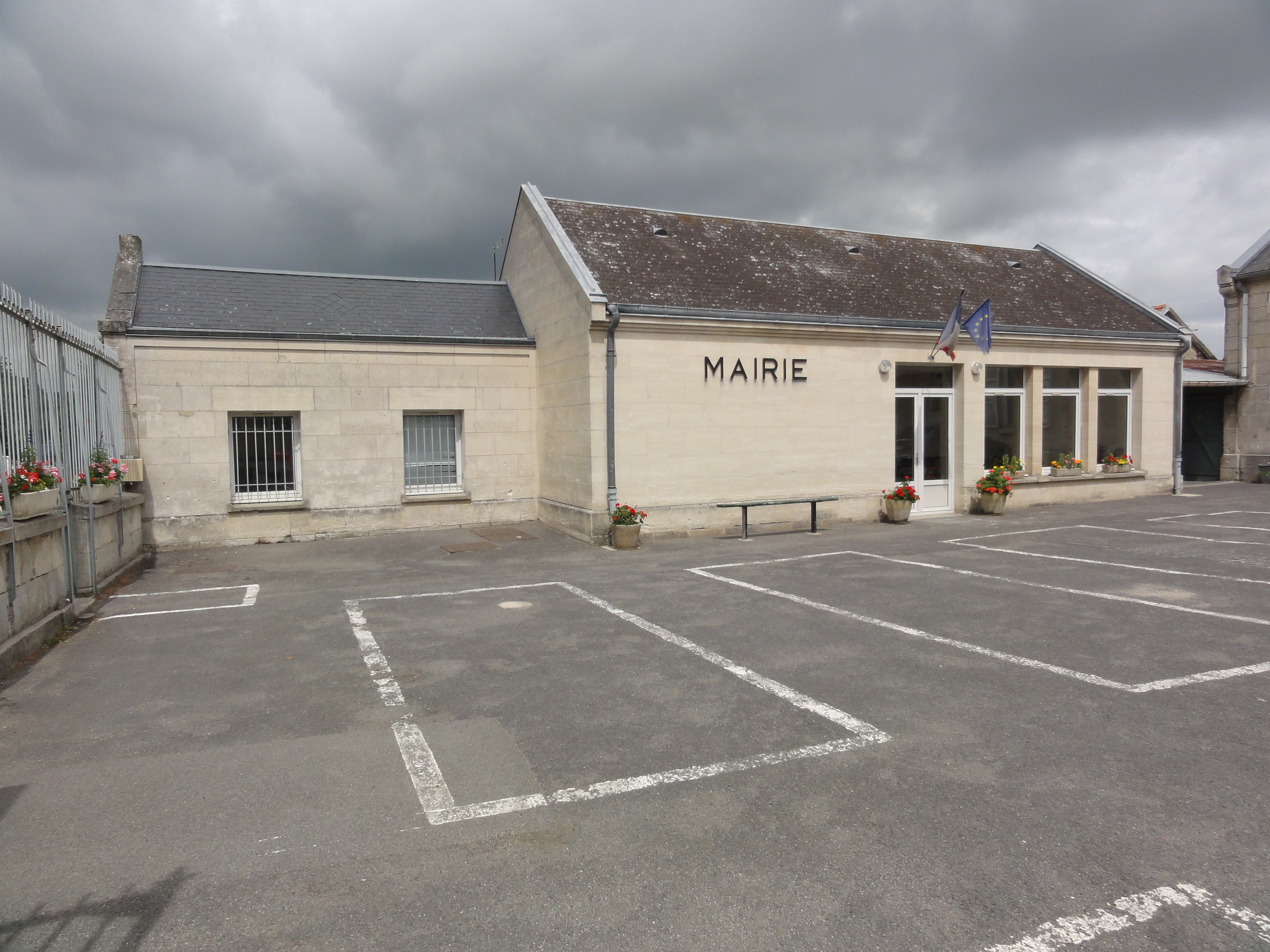
- The town hall of Ciry-Salsogne

- Coat of arms
- Location of Ciry-Salsogne
- Location within France Location within Hauts-de-France
- Coordinates: 49°21′46″N 3°27′46″E
- Country: France
- Region: Hauts-de-France
- Department: Aisne
- Arrondissement: Soissons
- Canton: Fère-en-Tardenois
- Intercommunality: Val de l'Aisne

Government
  - Mayor (2026–32): Marcel Baston
- Area^{1}: 8.95 km^{2} (3.46 sq mi)
- Elevation: 79 m (259 ft)
- Highest elevation: 170 m (560 ft)
- Lowest elevation: 42 m (138 ft)
- Population (2023): 882
  - Density: 98.5/km^{2} (255/sq mi)
- Time zone: UTC+01:00 (CET)
  - Summer (DST): UTC+02:00 (CEST)
- INSEE/Postal code: 02195 /02220
- ^{1} French Land Register data, which excludes lakes, ponds, glaciers > 1 km^{2} (0.386 sq mi or 247 acres) and river estuaries.

Ciry-Salsogne is a commune in the Aisne department in Hauts-de-France in northern France.

== Population ==
Historical population
Year	Pop.	±% p.a.
1968	464	—
1975	483	+0.57%
1982	535	+1.47%
1990	629	+2.04%
1999	649	+0.35%
2007	815	+2.89%
2012	887	+1.71%
2017	930	+0.95%
2023	882	−0.88%
Source: INSEE

== See also ==
- Communes of the Aisne department
