= Bagneux, Aisne =

Bagneux
- Commune
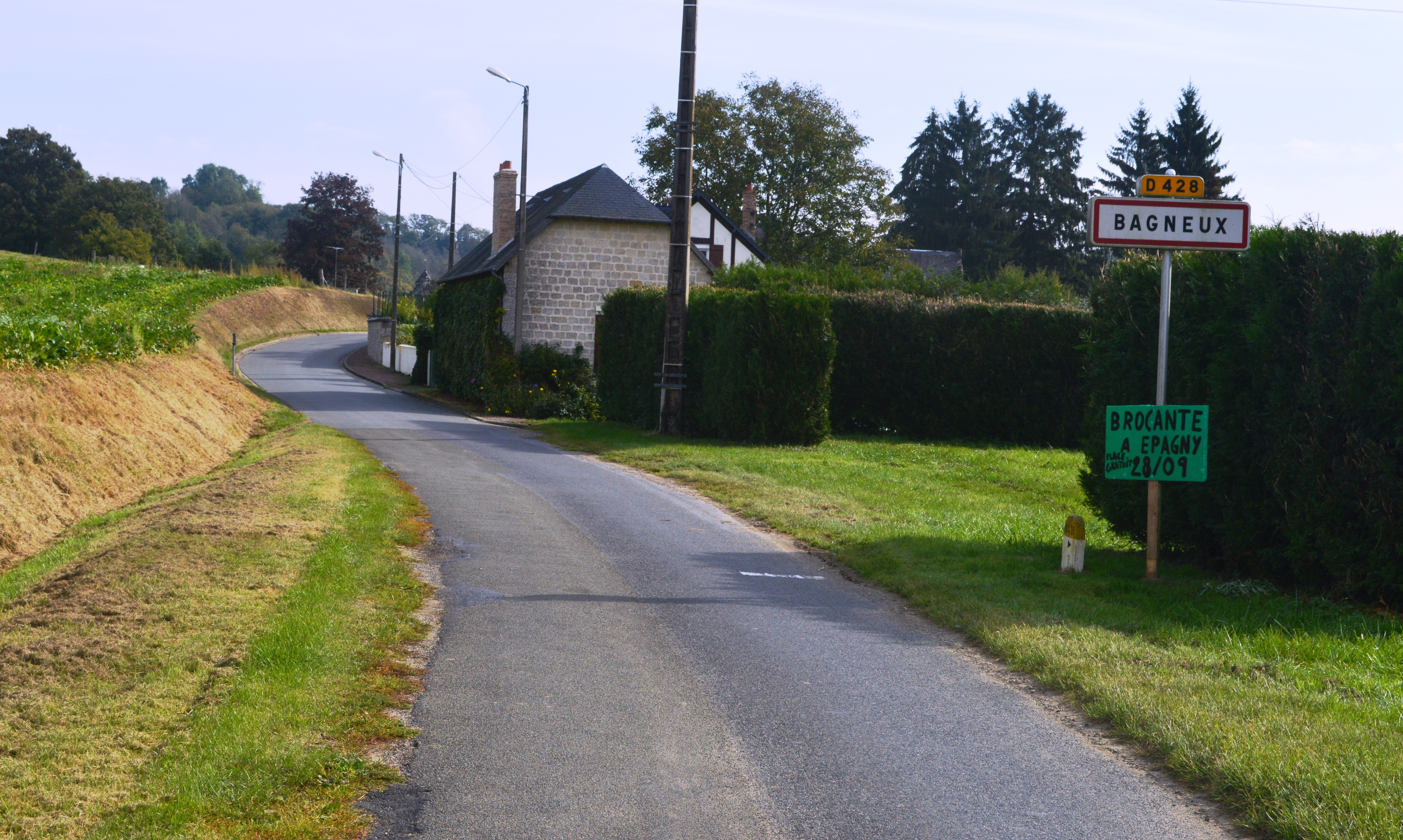
- Location of Bagneux
- Location within France Location within Hauts-de-France
- Coordinates: 49°27′29″N 3°16′46″E
- Country: France
- Region: Hauts-de-France
- Department: Aisne
- Arrondissement: Soissons
- Canton: Soissons-1
- Intercommunality: GrandSoissons Agglomération

Government
  - Mayor (2026–32): Jean-Marie Dubois
- Area^{1}: 2.21 km^{2} (0.85 sq mi)
- Elevation: 88 m (289 ft)
- Highest elevation: 149 m (489 ft)
- Lowest elevation: 72 m (236 ft)
- Population (2023): 62
  - Density: 28/km^{2} (73/sq mi)
- Time zone: UTC+01:00 (CET)
  - Summer (DST): UTC+02:00 (CEST)
- INSEE/Postal code: 02043 /02290
- ^{1} French Land Register data, which excludes lakes, ponds, glaciers > 1 km^{2} (0.386 sq mi or 247 acres) and river estuaries.

Bagneux (French pronunciation: [baɲø]) is a commune in the department of Aisne in the Hauts-de-France region of northern France.

== Geography ==
Bagneux is located some 10 km north by northwest of Soissons and 25 km southeast of Noyon. It can be accessed by road D428 from Épagny in the west running east through the commune to Juvigny. The south and west of the commune are heavily forested slopes with the rest of the commune flat farmland.

Part of the southern border of the commune is formed by Le Plat Ru stream which joins the Ru de Mareuil which is the western border of the commune and continues west.

== History ==
In the second round of the French presidential election of 2002 Bagneux had the fifteenth largest vote for Jean-Marie Le Pen in France. His score in the commune was 53.85% of the total vote.

== Administration ==
List of Successive Mayors of Bagneux

Mayors from the French Revolution to 1941

| From | To | Name |
|---|---|---|
| 1790 | 1790 | Louis François Garnier |
| 1790 | 1793 | Jean Baptiste Alliette |
| 1793 | 1793 | Pierre Moreau |
| 1793 | 1794 | Jean Denis Leve |
| 1794 | 1794 | Charles Louis Varnier |
| 1794 | 1794 | François Augustin Garnier |
| 1794 | 1794 | Charles François Charpentier |
| 1794 | 1794 | Jean François Lardo |
| 1794 | 1794 | Pierre Bouchard |
| 1794 | 1794 | Denis Bancelin |
| 1794 | 1794 | Jean Baptiste Lardo |
| 1794 | 1794 | Nicolas Cordier |
| 1794 | 1795 | Pierre Robert Plateaux |
| 1795 | 1801 | Jean Baptiste Fortin |
| 1801 | 1807 | Pierre Christophe Vollee |
| 1809 | 1810 | Varnier |
| 1811 | 1812 | Lerat |
| 1812 | 1815 | Jean André Bancelin |
| 1815 | 1825 | Auguste Pierre de Varenne |
| 1826 | 1834 | Louis Michel Garnier |
| 1834 | 1836 | François Edmé Joseph Martineau |
| 1836 | 1840 | Charles Philippe Bazin |
| 1840 | 1848 | François Bauzon |
| 1848 | 1854 | Denis André Bancelin |
| 1854 | 1858 | Louis Pierre Prosper Bancelin |
| 1858 | 1865 | Louis Pierre Rousseau |
| 1865 | 1869 | François Louis Charles Huillier |
| 1869 | 1870 | Louis Surivet |
| 1870 | 1881 | Philippe Auguste Leviaux |
| 1881 | 1888 | Achille Gruyer |
| 1888 | 1899 | Jean Baptiste Dervieux |
| 1899 | 1935 | Théodore Richard Tissier |
| 1935 | 1939 | Albert Petit |
| 1939 | 1941 | FlorenceN |

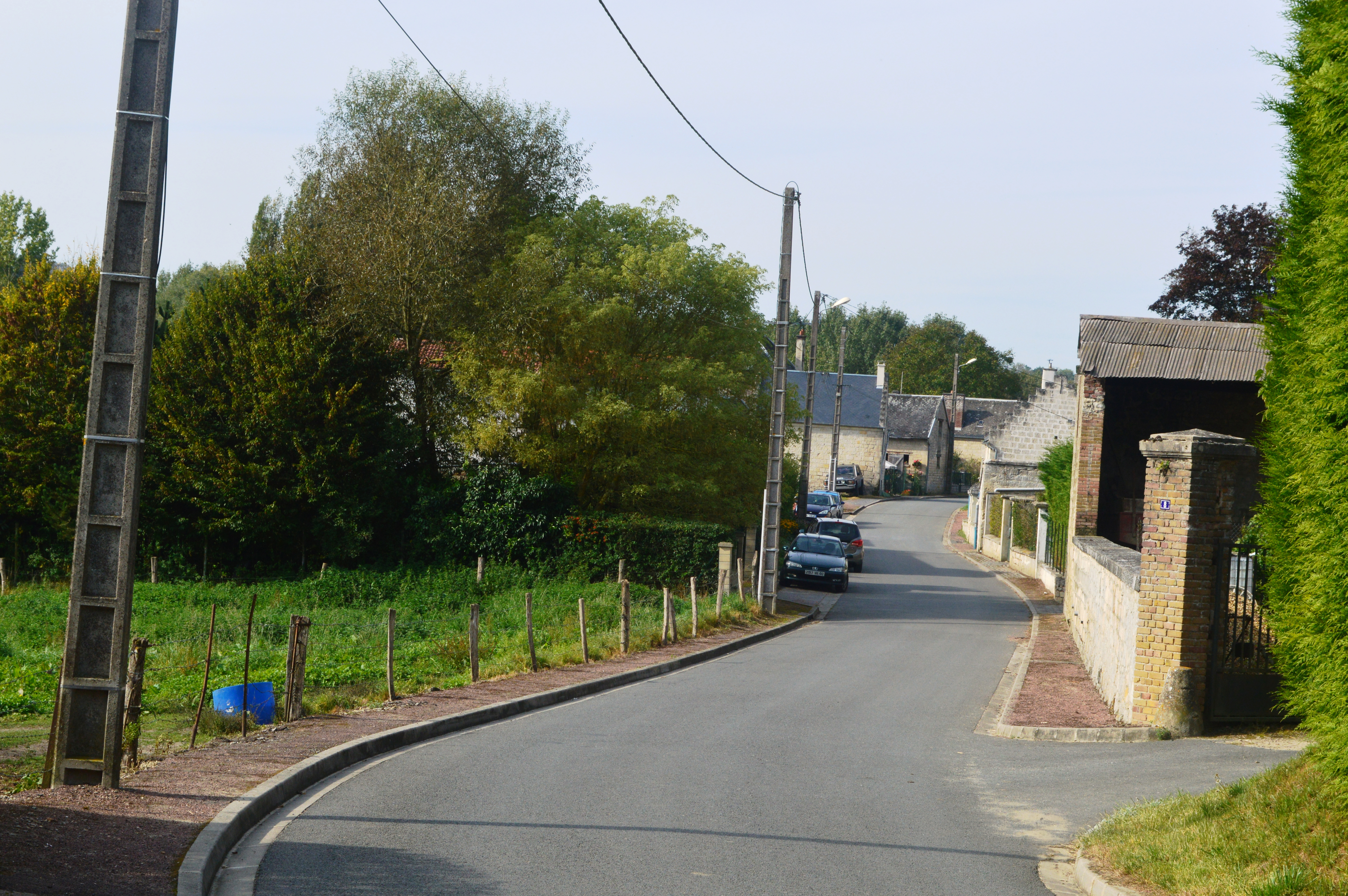
A street in Bagneux

Mayors from 1941

| From | To | Name | Party |
|---|---|---|---|
| 1941 | 1944 | Maurice Grandjean | |
| 1944 | 1945 | Piret | |
| 1945 | 1963 | Albert Petit | |
| 1963 | 1985 | Henri Ravera | |
| 1985 | 2001 | Janine Jambu | |
| 2001 | Current | Jean-Marie Dubois | DVG |

== Population ==
Historical population
| Year | Pop. | ±% p.a. |
|---|---|---|
| 1968 | 52 | — |
| 1975 | 58 | +1.57% |
| 1982 | 68 | +2.30% |
| 1990 | 61 | −1.35% |
| 1999 | 62 | +0.18% |
| 2007 | 71 | +1.71% |
| 2012 | 72 | +0.28% |
| 2017 | 69 | −0.85% |
| 2023 | 62 | −1.77% |
Source: INSEE

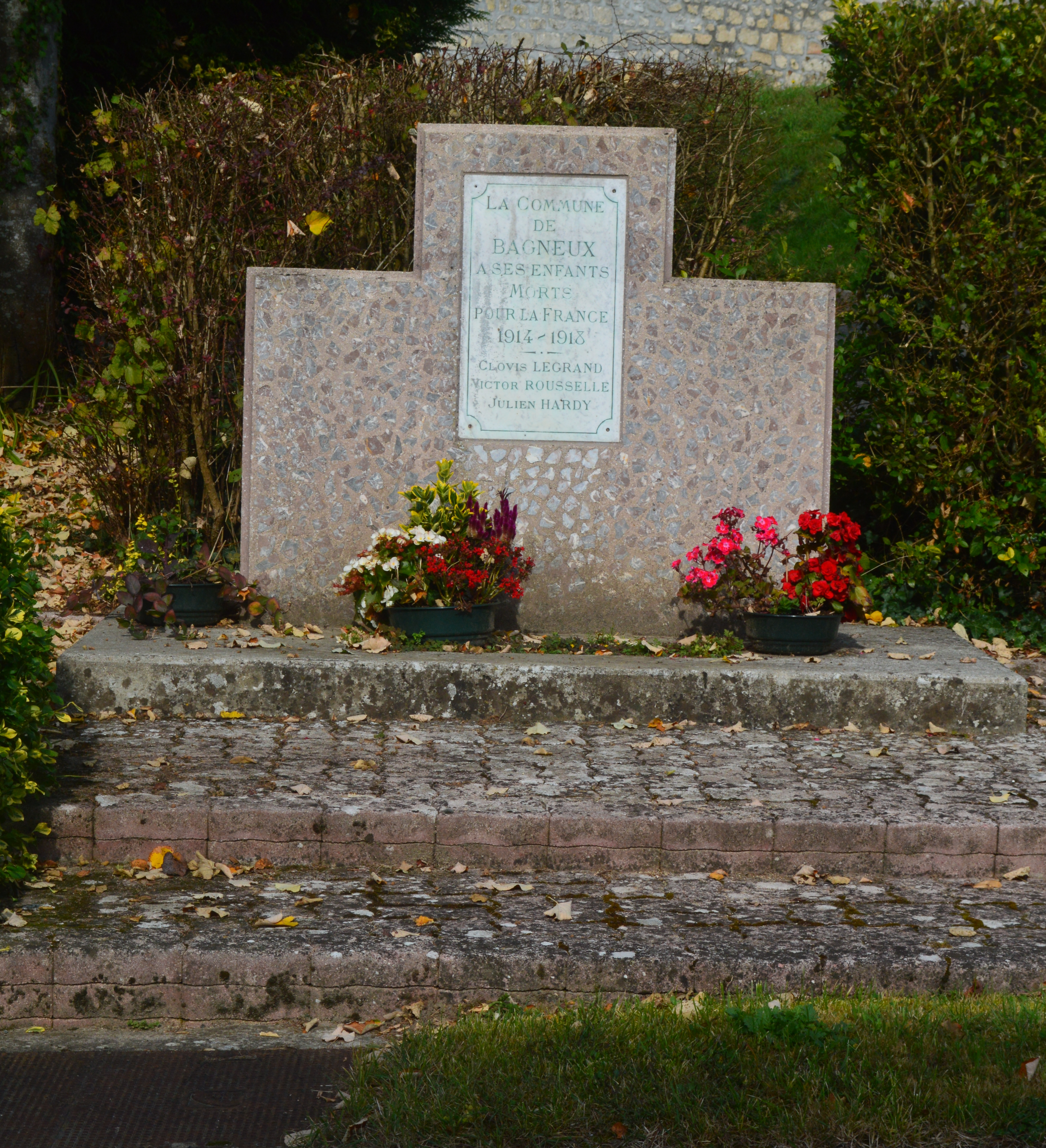
Bagneux War Memorial

== Sites and monuments ==
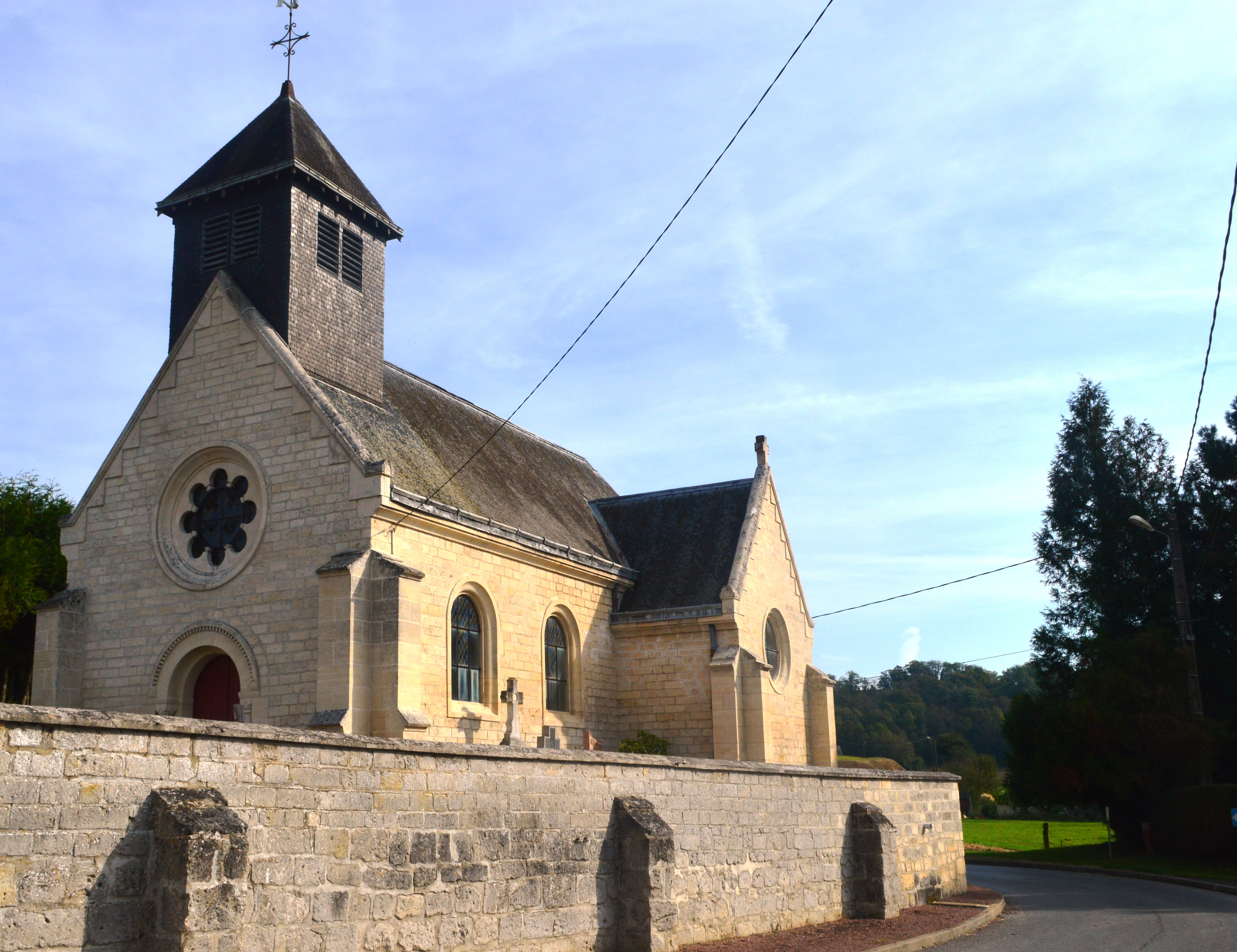
Bagneux Church

The Church contains two items that are registered as historical objects:

- A Group Sculpture: Saint Martin and the pauper (16th century)
- A Baptismal font (destroyed) (13th century)

== See also ==
- Communes of the Aisne department
