= Charles Binet =

French Archbishop of Besançon and Cardinal

His Eminence Charles Binet
- Cardinal, Archbishop of Besançon
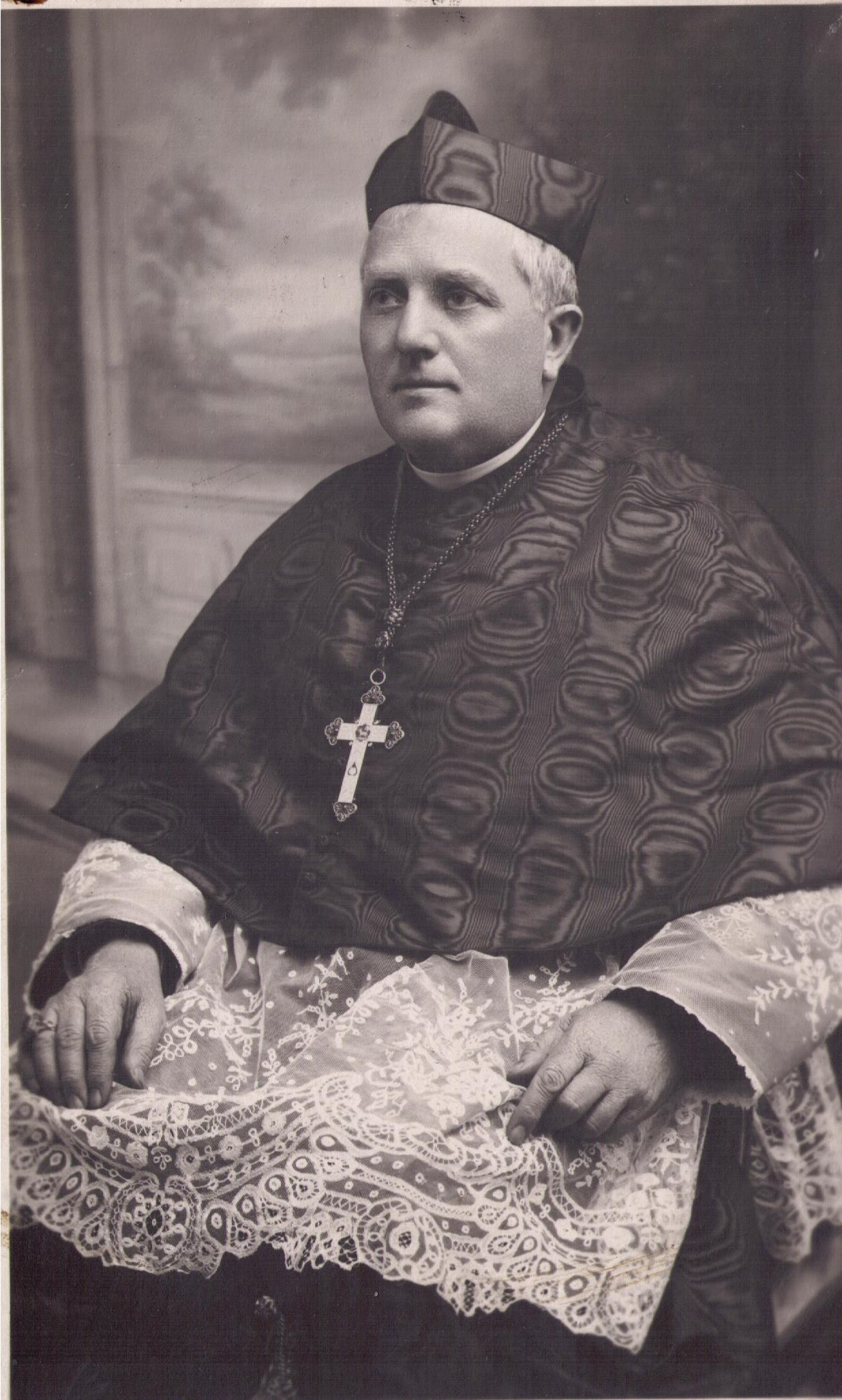
- Church: Roman Catholic Church
- Archdiocese: Besançon
- See: Besançon
- Appointed: 31 October 1927
- Term ended: 15 July 1936
- Predecessor: Louis Humbrecht
- Successor: Maurice-Louis Dubourg
- Other post: Cardinal-Priest of Santa Prisca (1927-36)
- Previous posts: Bishop of Soissons (1920-27); Apostolic Administrator of Soissons (1927-28)

Orders
- Ordination: 22 October 1893
- Consecration: 24 August 1920 by Louis-Henri-Joseph Luçon
- Created cardinal: 19 December 1927 by Pope Pius XI
- Rank: Cardinal-Priest

Personal details
- Born: Charles Binet; 8 April 1869 Juvigny, France
- Died: 15 July 1936 (aged 67) Besançon, France
- Buried: Besançon Cathedral
- Motto: Da robur fer auxilium
- Coat of arms

Styles of Charles Binet
- Reference style: His Eminence
- Spoken style: Your Eminence
- Informal style: Cardinal
- See: Besançon

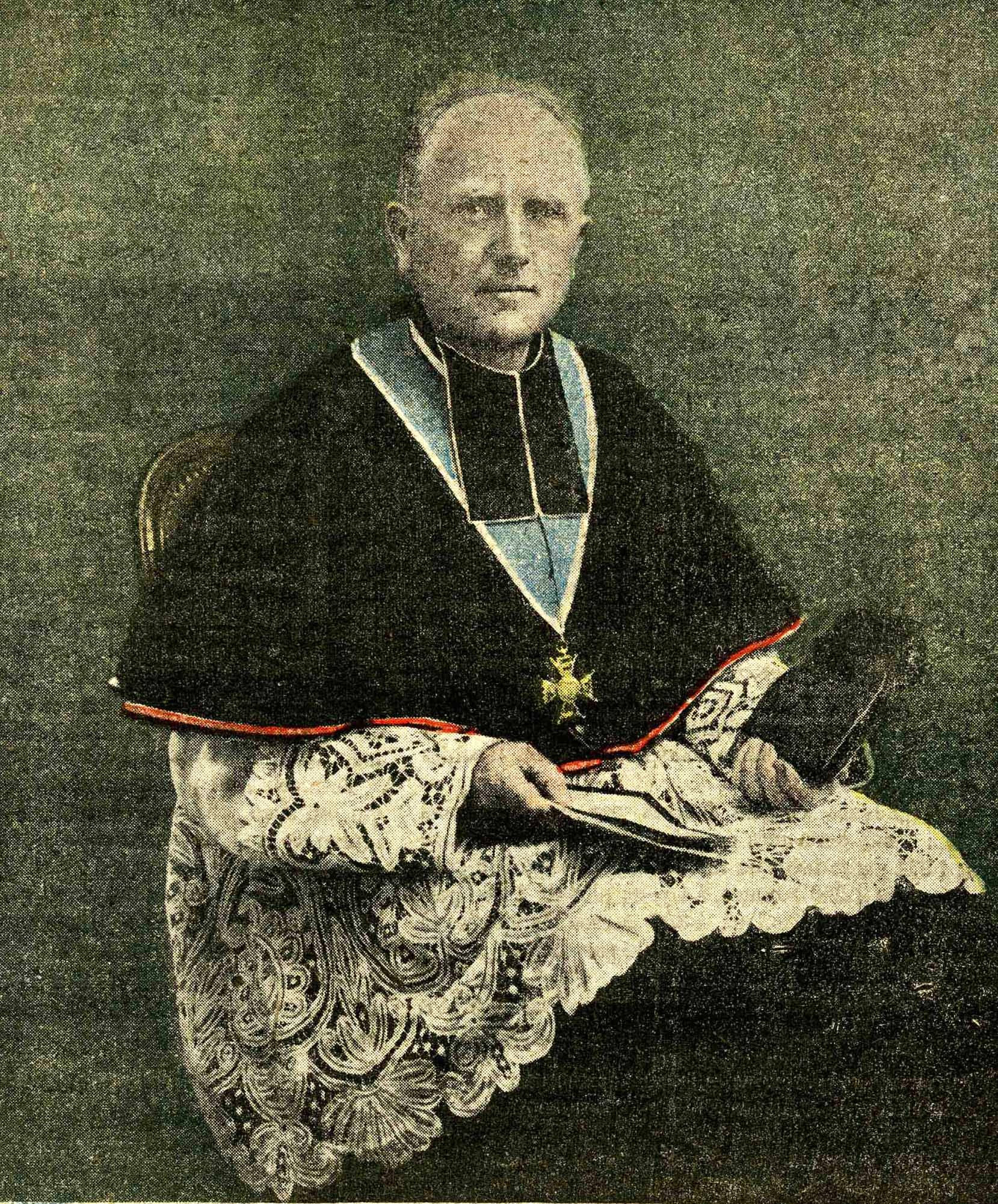
Charles Binet.

Charles Henri Joseph Binet (8 April 1869 – 15 July 1936) was a French Archbishop of Besançon and Cardinal.

== Biography ==
Charles Binet was born in Juvigny, France, the eldest of eight children of a farming family. He was educated at the Seminary of Saint-Sulpice, Paris, and at the Seminary of Notre Dame des Champs. He was ordained on 22 October 1893 in Soissons. He worked in the diocese doing pastoral work until 1895. He served as a faculty member of the Seminary of Soissons until 1914, during which time he was also appointed as Diocesan archivist in 1900. He served in the French Army during World War I. He was appointed vicar general and archdeacon of the diocese of Laon on 13 February 1919.

== Episcopate ==
Pope Benedict XV appointed him Bishop of Soissons on 16 June 1920. He was consecrated on 24 August 1920 at the cathedral of Soissons by Cardinal Louis Luçon, Archbishop of Reims. He was promoted to the metropolitan see of Besançon on 31 October 1927, but continued at the previous see as apostolic administrator until 1 May 1928.

== Cardinalate ==
He was created and proclaimed Cardinal-Priest of S. Prisca by Pope Pius XI in the consistory of 19 December 1927. He died on 15 July 1936 and is buried in Besançon.
