= Leury =

- Commune
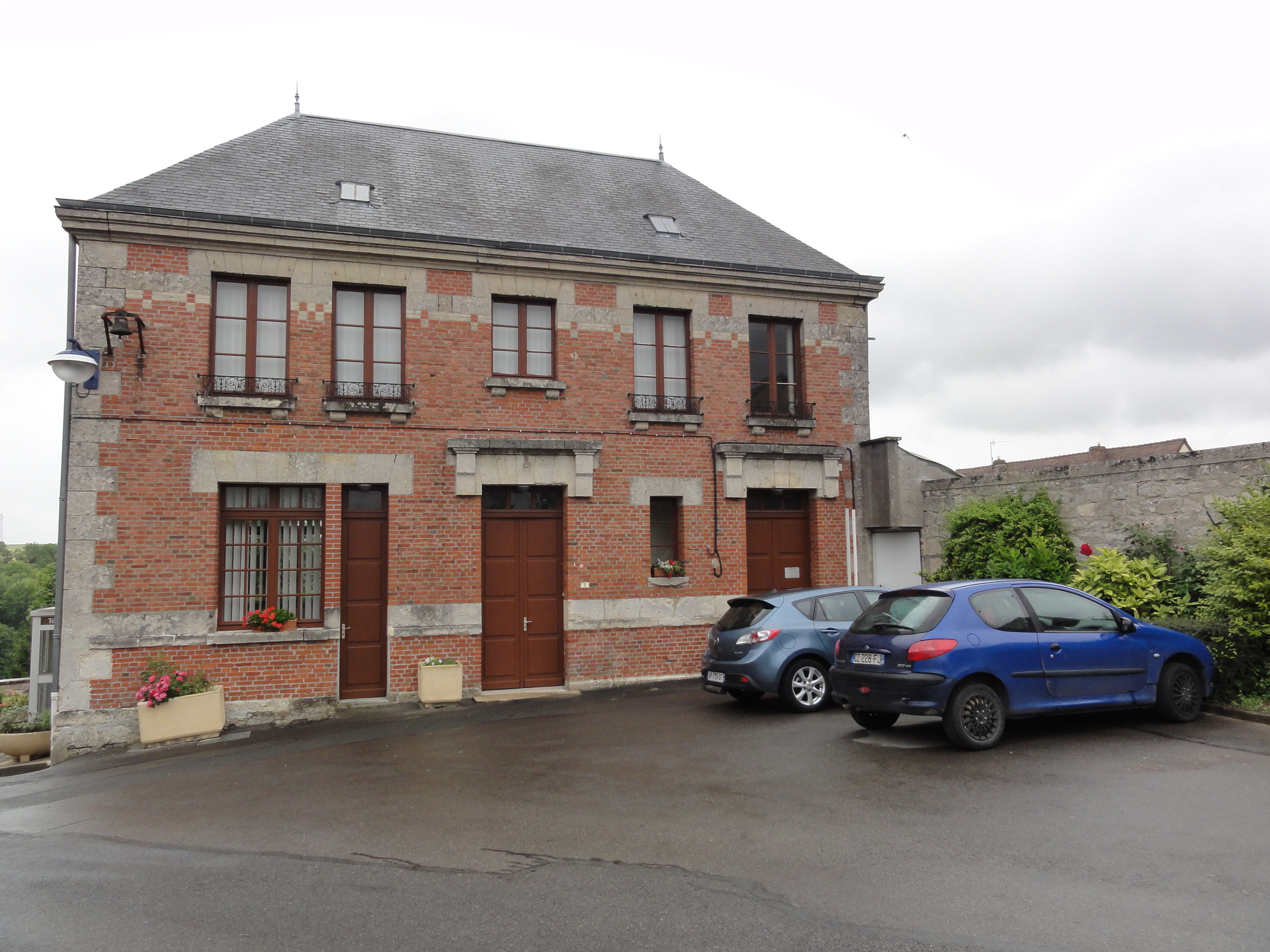
- The town hall of Leury
- Location of Leury
- Location within France Location within Hauts-de-France
- Coordinates: 49°25′54″N 3°20′14″E
- Country: France
- Region: Hauts-de-France
- Department: Aisne
- Arrondissement: Soissons
- Canton: Soissons-1
- Intercommunality: GrandSoissons Agglomération

Government
  - Mayor (2026–32): Thérèse Ferton-Herpe
- Area^{1}: 3.69 km^{2} (1.42 sq mi)
- Elevation: 188 m (617 ft)
- Highest elevation: 162 m (531 ft)
- Lowest elevation: 79 m (259 ft)
- Population (2023): 101
  - Density: 27.4/km^{2} (70.9/sq mi)
- Time zone: UTC+01:00 (CET)
  - Summer (DST): UTC+02:00 (CEST)
- INSEE/Postal code: 02424 /02880
- ^{1} French Land Register data, which excludes lakes, ponds, glaciers > 1 km^{2} (0.386 sq mi or 247 acres) and river estuaries.

Leury (French pronunciation: [lœʁi]) is a commune in the Aisne department in Hauts-de-France in northern France.

== Population ==
Historical population
Year	Pop.	±% p.a.
1968	120	—
1975	101	−2.43%
1982	139	+4.67%
1990	135	−0.36%
1999	113	−1.96%
2007	106	−0.80%
2012	106	+0.00%
2017	106	+0.00%
2023	101	−0.80%
Source: INSEE

== See also ==
- Communes of the Aisne department
