= Cuffies =

- Commune
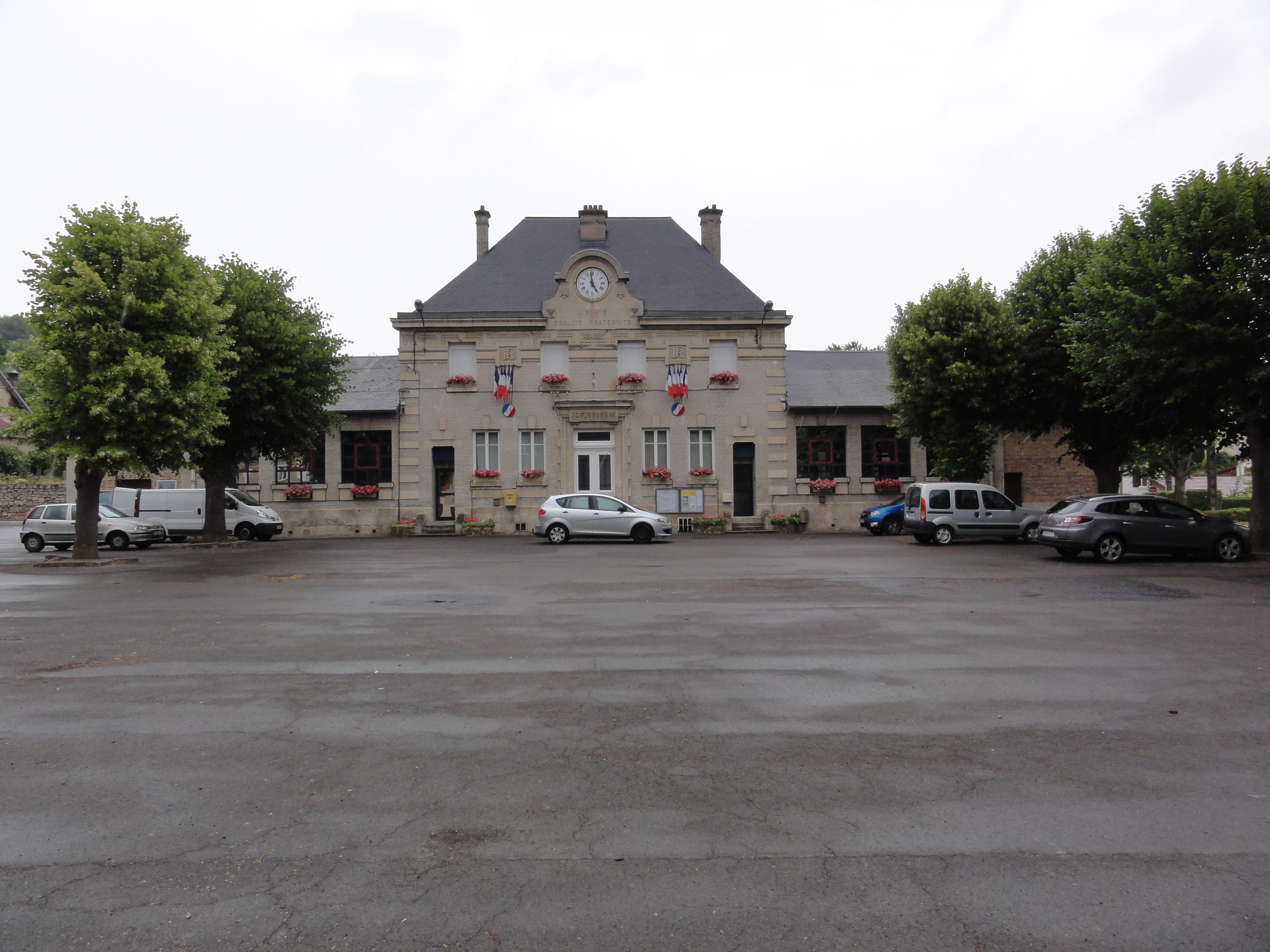
- The town hall of Cuffies
- Location of Cuffies
- Location within France Location within Hauts-de-France
- Coordinates: 49°24′21″N 3°19′13″E
- Country: France
- Region: Hauts-de-France
- Department: Aisne
- Arrondissement: Soissons
- Canton: Soissons-1
- Intercommunality: GrandSoissons Agglomération

Government
  - Mayor (2026–32): Serge Dufour
- Area^{1}: 5.02 km^{2} (1.94 sq mi)
- Elevation: 65 m (213 ft)
- Highest elevation: 155 m (509 ft)
- Lowest elevation: 39 m (128 ft)
- Population (2023): 1,733
  - Density: 345/km^{2} (894/sq mi)
- Time zone: UTC+01:00 (CET)
  - Summer (DST): UTC+02:00 (CEST)
- INSEE/Postal code: 02245 /02880
- ^{1} French Land Register data, which excludes lakes, ponds, glaciers > 1 km^{2} (0.386 sq mi or 247 acres) and river estuaries.

Cuffies (French pronunciation: [kyfi]) is a commune in the Aisne department in Hauts-de-France in northern France.

== Population ==
Historical population
Year	Pop.	±% p.a.
1968	1,598	—
1975	1,473	−1.16%
1982	1,279	−2.00%
1990	1,320	+0.40%
1999	1,496	+1.40%
2007	1,708	+1.67%
2012	1,793	+0.98%
2017	1,789	−0.04%
2023	1,733	−0.53%
Source: INSEE

== See also ==
- Communes of the Aisne department
