= Villeneuve-Saint-Germain =

- Commune
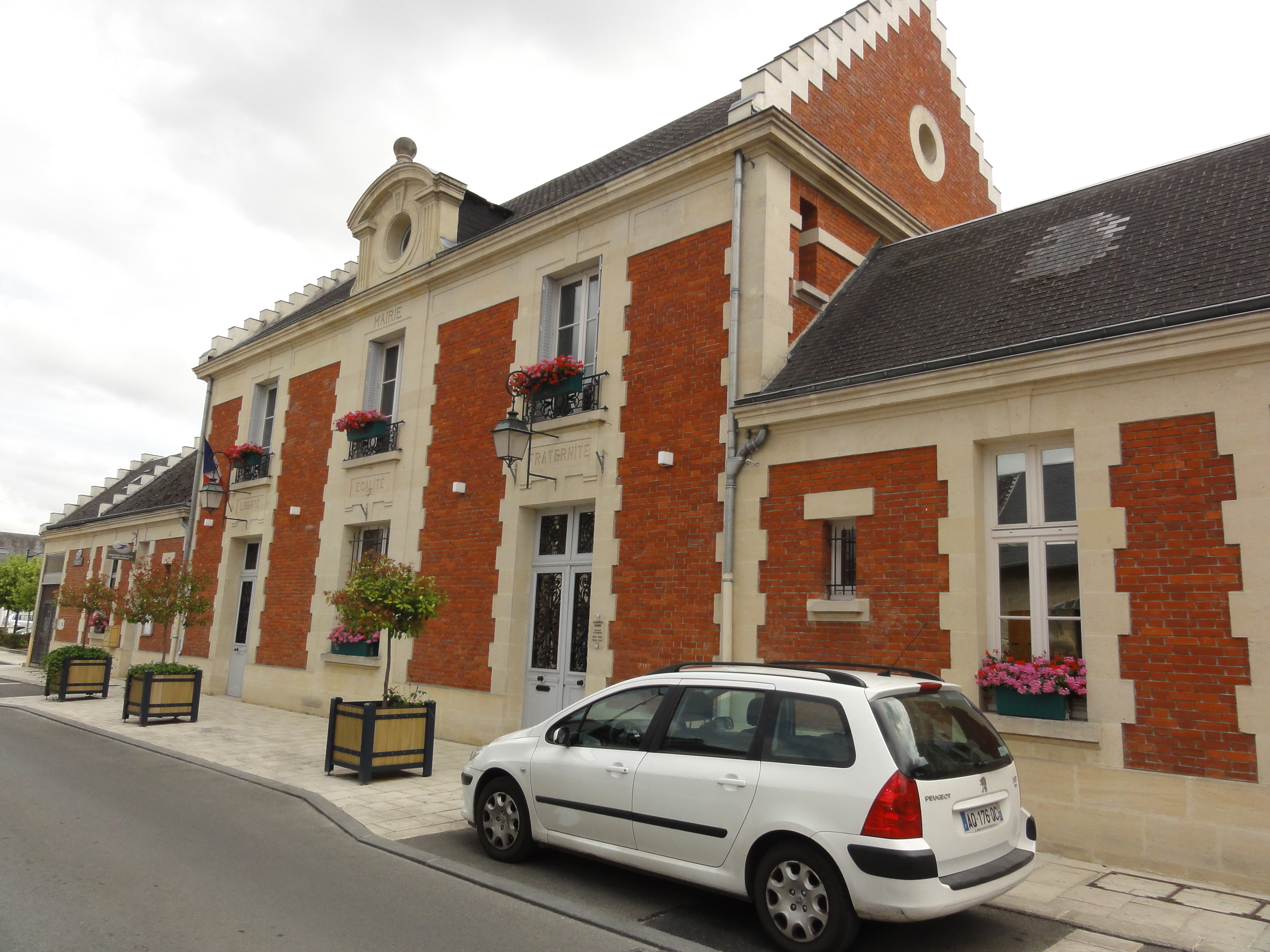
- The town hall of Villeneuve-Saint-Germain

- Coat of arms
- Location of Villeneuve-Saint-Germain
- Location within France Location within Hauts-de-France
- Coordinates: 49°22′48″N 3°21′34″E
- Country: France
- Region: Hauts-de-France
- Department: Aisne
- Arrondissement: Soissons
- Canton: Soissons-1
- Intercommunality: GrandSoissons Agglomération

Government
  - Mayor (2026–32): Alex Desumeur
- Area^{1}: 4.54 km^{2} (1.75 sq mi)
- Elevation: 51 m (167 ft)
- Highest elevation: 89 m (292 ft)
- Lowest elevation: 42 m (138 ft)
- Population (2023): 2,616
  - Density: 576/km^{2} (1,490/sq mi)
- Time zone: UTC+01:00 (CET)
  - Summer (DST): UTC+02:00 (CEST)
- INSEE/Postal code: 02805 /02200
- ^{1} French Land Register data, which excludes lakes, ponds, glaciers > 1 km^{2} (0.386 sq mi or 247 acres) and river estuaries.

Villeneuve-Saint-Germain (French pronunciation: [vilnœv sɛ̃ ʒɛʁmɛ̃]) is a commune in the Aisne department in Hauts-de-France in northern France.

== Population ==
Historical population

| Year | Pop. | ±% p.a. |
|---|---|---|
| 1793 | 354 | — |
| 1800 | 378 | +0.94% |
| 1806 | 349 | −1.32% |
| 1821 | 309 | −0.81% |
| 1831 | 355 | +1.40% |
| 1836 | 345 | −0.57% |
| 1841 | 348 | +0.17% |
| 1846 | 395 | +2.57% |
| 1851 | 366 | −1.51% |
| 1856 | 406 | +2.10% |
| 1861 | 482 | +3.49% |
| 1866 | 509 | +1.10% |
| 1872 | 556 | +1.48% |
| 1876 | 599 | +1.88% |
| 1881 | 645 | +1.49% |
| 1886 | 616 | −0.92% |
| 1891 | 688 | +2.24% |
| 1896 | 764 | +2.12% |
| 1901 | 912 | +3.60% |

| Year | Pop. | ±% p.a. |
|---|---|---|
| 1906 | 1,126 | +4.31% |
| 1911 | 1,132 | +0.11% |
| 1921 | 855 | −2.77% |
| 1926 | 1,347 | +9.52% |
| 1931 | 1,386 | +0.57% |
| 1936 | 1,415 | +0.42% |
| 1946 | 1,323 | −0.67% |
| 1954 | 1,581 | +2.25% |
| 1962 | 1,850 | +1.98% |
| 1968 | 2,783 | +7.04% |
| 1975 | 2,919 | +0.68% |
| 1982 | 2,833 | −0.43% |
| 1990 | 2,580 | −1.16% |
| 1999 | 2,312 | −1.21% |
| 2007 | 2,413 | +0.54% |
| 2012 | 2,486 | +0.60% |
| 2017 | 2,490 | +0.03% |
| 2023 | 2,616 | +0.83% |

Source: EHESS and INSEE (1968-2023)

== See also ==
- Communes of the Aisne department
