= Vregny =

- Commune
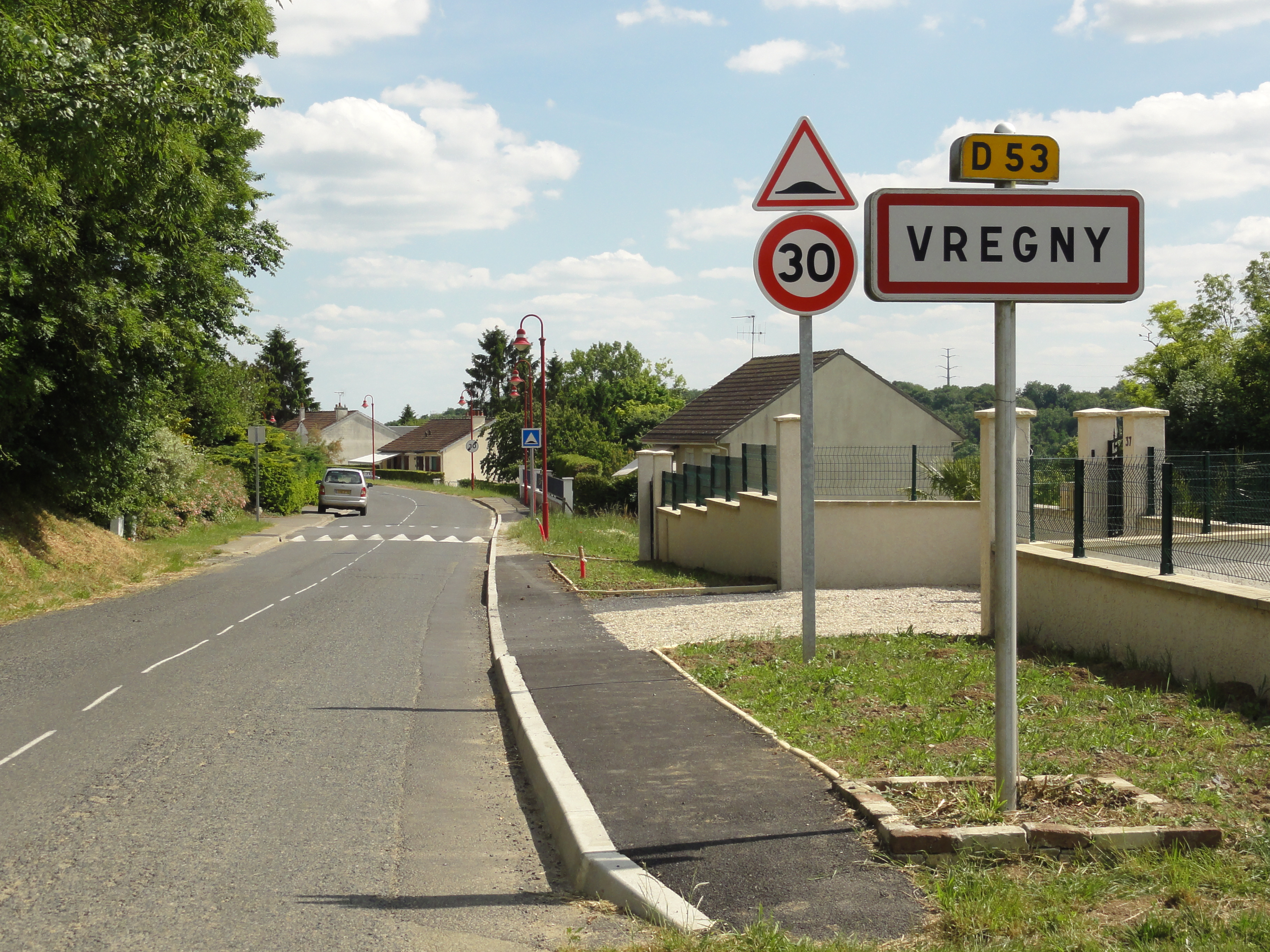
- The road into Vregny
- Location of Vregny
- Location within France Location within Hauts-de-France
- Coordinates: 49°24′32″N 3°25′26″E
- Country: France
- Region: Hauts-de-France
- Department: Aisne
- Arrondissement: Soissons
- Canton: Soissons-1
- Intercommunality: GrandSoissons Agglomération

Government
  - Mayor (2026–32): Noël Tordeux
- Area^{1}: 4.5 km^{2} (1.7 sq mi)
- Elevation: 185 m (607 ft)
- Highest elevation: 166 m (545 ft)
- Lowest elevation: 69 m (226 ft)
- Population (2023): 89
  - Density: 20/km^{2} (51/sq mi)
- Time zone: UTC+01:00 (CET)
  - Summer (DST): UTC+02:00 (CEST)
- INSEE/Postal code: 02828 /02880
- ^{1} French Land Register data, which excludes lakes, ponds, glaciers > 1 km^{2} (0.386 sq mi or 247 acres) and river estuaries.

Vregny is a commune in the Aisne department in Hauts-de-France in northern France.

== Population ==
Historical population
Year	Pop.	±% p.a.
1968	125	—
1975	119	−0.70%
1982	105	−1.77%
1990	101	−0.48%
1999	102	+0.11%
2007	94	−1.02%
2012	89	−1.09%
2017	93	+0.88%
2023	89	−0.73%
Source: INSEE

== See also ==
- Communes of the Aisne department
