= Venizel =

- Commune
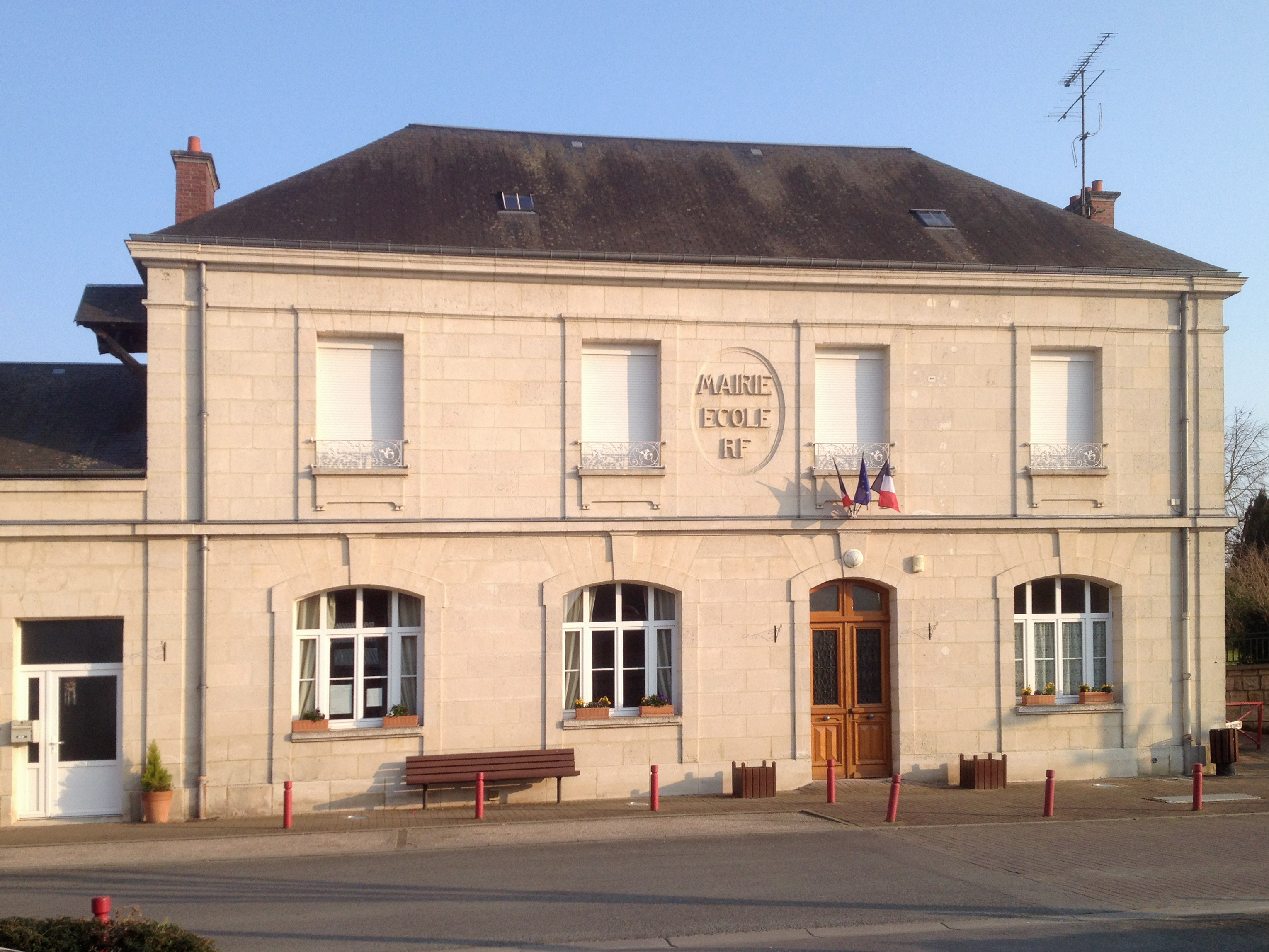
- The town hall of Venizel
- Location of Venizel
- Location within France Location within Hauts-de-France
- Coordinates: 49°21′59″N 3°23′36″E
- Country: France
- Region: Hauts-de-France
- Department: Aisne
- Arrondissement: Soissons
- Canton: Soissons-1
- Intercommunality: GrandSoissons Agglomération

Government
  - Mayor (2026–32): Stéphanie Lebée-Delattre
- Area^{1}: 3.71 km^{2} (1.43 sq mi)
- Elevation: 45 m (148 ft)
- Highest elevation: 85 m (279 ft)
- Lowest elevation: 42 m (138 ft)
- Population (2023): 1,324
  - Density: 357/km^{2} (924/sq mi)
- Time zone: UTC+01:00 (CET)
  - Summer (DST): UTC+02:00 (CEST)
- INSEE/Postal code: 02780 /02200
- ^{1} French Land Register data, which excludes lakes, ponds, glaciers > 1 km^{2} (0.386 sq mi or 247 acres) and river estuaries.

Venizel (French pronunciation: [vənizɛl]) is a commune in the Aisne department, located in the Hauts-de-France region of northern France.

== Population ==
Historical population
Year	Pop.	±% p.a.
1968	1,532	—
1975	1,651	+1.07%
1982	1,461	−1.73%
1990	1,522	+0.51%
1999	1,462	−0.45%
2007	1,391	−0.62%
2012	1,343	−0.70%
2017	1,378	+0.52%
2023	1,324	−0.66%
Source: INSEE

== See also ==
- Communes of the Aisne department
