= Osly-Courtil =

- Commune
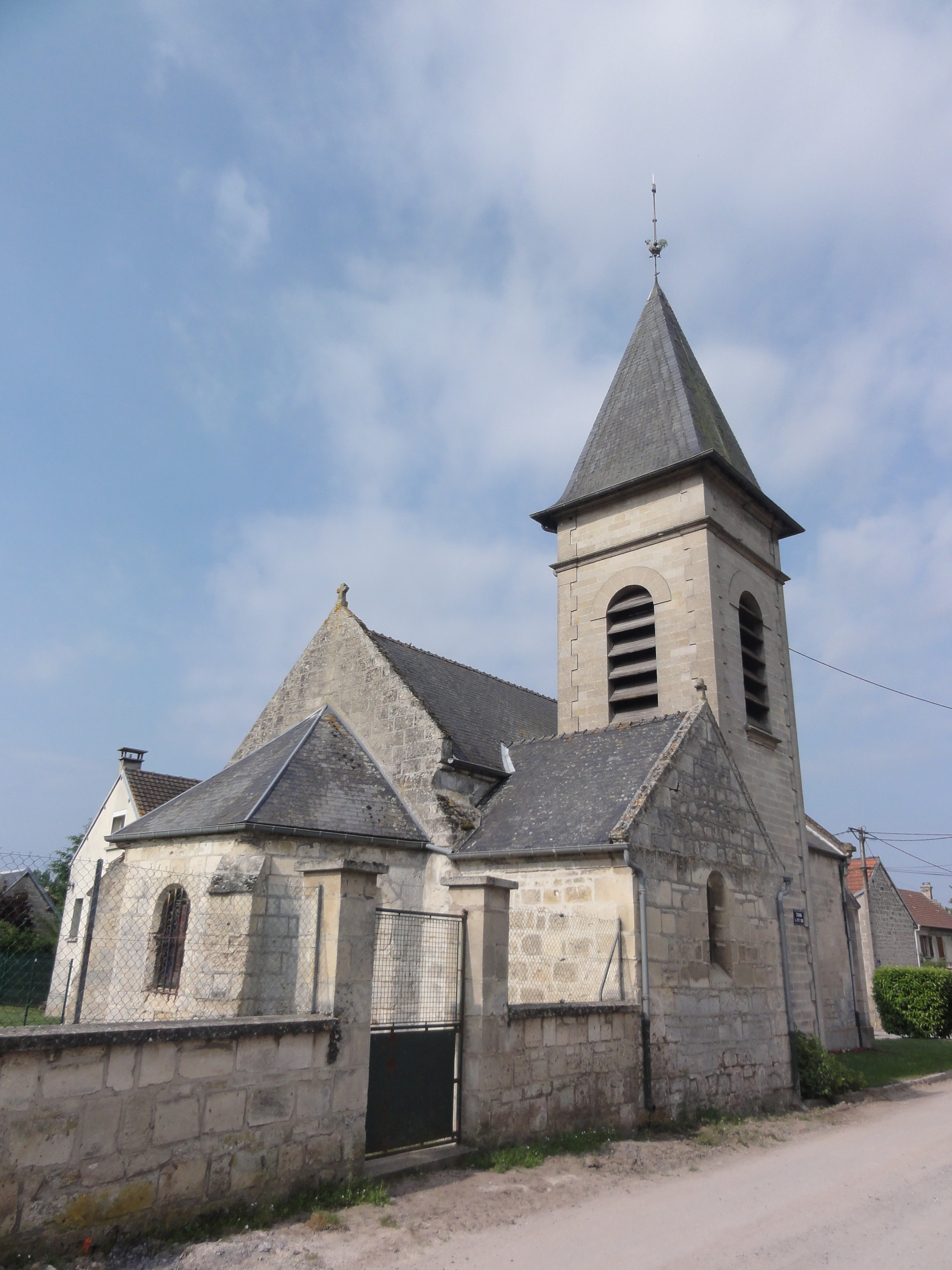
- The church of Osly-Courtil
- Location of Osly-Courtil
- Location within France Location within Hauts-de-France
- Coordinates: 49°24′08″N 3°13′36″E
- Country: France
- Region: Hauts-de-France
- Department: Aisne
- Arrondissement: Soissons
- Canton: Soissons-1
- Intercommunality: GrandSoissons Agglomération

Government
  - Mayor (2026–32): Anne-Laure Smolarek
- Area^{1}: 5.23 km^{2} (2.02 sq mi)
- Elevation: 50 m (160 ft)
- Highest elevation: 115 m (377 ft)
- Lowest elevation: 37 m (121 ft)
- Population (2023): 325
  - Density: 62.1/km^{2} (161/sq mi)
- Time zone: UTC+01:00 (CET)
  - Summer (DST): UTC+02:00 (CEST)
- INSEE/Postal code: 02576 /02290
- ^{1} French Land Register data, which excludes lakes, ponds, glaciers > 1 km^{2} (0.386 sq mi or 247 acres) and river estuaries.

Osly-Courtil is a commune in the Aisne department in Hauts-de-France in northern France.

== Population ==
Historical population
Year	Pop.	±% p.a.
1968	173	—
1975	197	+1.87%
1982	239	+2.80%
1990	260	+1.06%
1999	273	+0.54%
2007	293	+0.89%
2012	304	+0.74%
2017	326	+1.41%
2023	325	−0.05%
Source: INSEE

== See also ==
- Communes of the Aisne department
