= GrandSoissons Agglomération =

- Communauté d'agglomération
- Interactive map of GrandSoissons Agglomération
- Coordinates: 49°22′N 03°20′E
- Country: France
- Region: Hauts-de-France
- Department: Aisne
- No. of communes: {{{nbcomm}}}
- Established: 1999
- Area: 181.0 km^{2} (69.9 sq mi)
- Population (2019): 52,764
  - Density: 291.5/km^{2} (755.0/sq mi)
- Website: agglo.grandsoissons.com

GrandSoissons Agglomération (before 2018: Communauté d’agglomération du Soissonnais) is the communauté d'agglomération, an intercommunal structure, centred on the town of Soissons. It is located in the Aisne department, in the Hauts-de-France region, northern France. Created in 1999, its seat is in Cuffies. Its area is 181.0 km^{2}. Its population was 52,764 in 2019, of which 28,712 in Soissons proper.

== Composition ==
The communauté d'agglomération consists of the following 27 communes:

1. Acy
2. Bagneux
3. Belleu
4. Bernoy-le-Château
5. Billy-sur-Aisne
6. Chavigny
7. Courmelles
8. Crouy
9. Cuffies
10. Cuisy-en-Almont
11. Juvigny
12. Leury
13. Mercin-et-Vaux
14. Missy-aux-Bois
15. Osly-Courtil
16. Pasly
17. Ploisy
18. Pommiers
19. Septmonts
20. Serches
21. Sermoise
22. Soissons
23. Vauxbuin
24. Vauxrezis
25. Venizel
26. Villeneuve-Saint-Germain
27. Vregny
