= Chavigny, Aisne =

Chavigny
- Commune
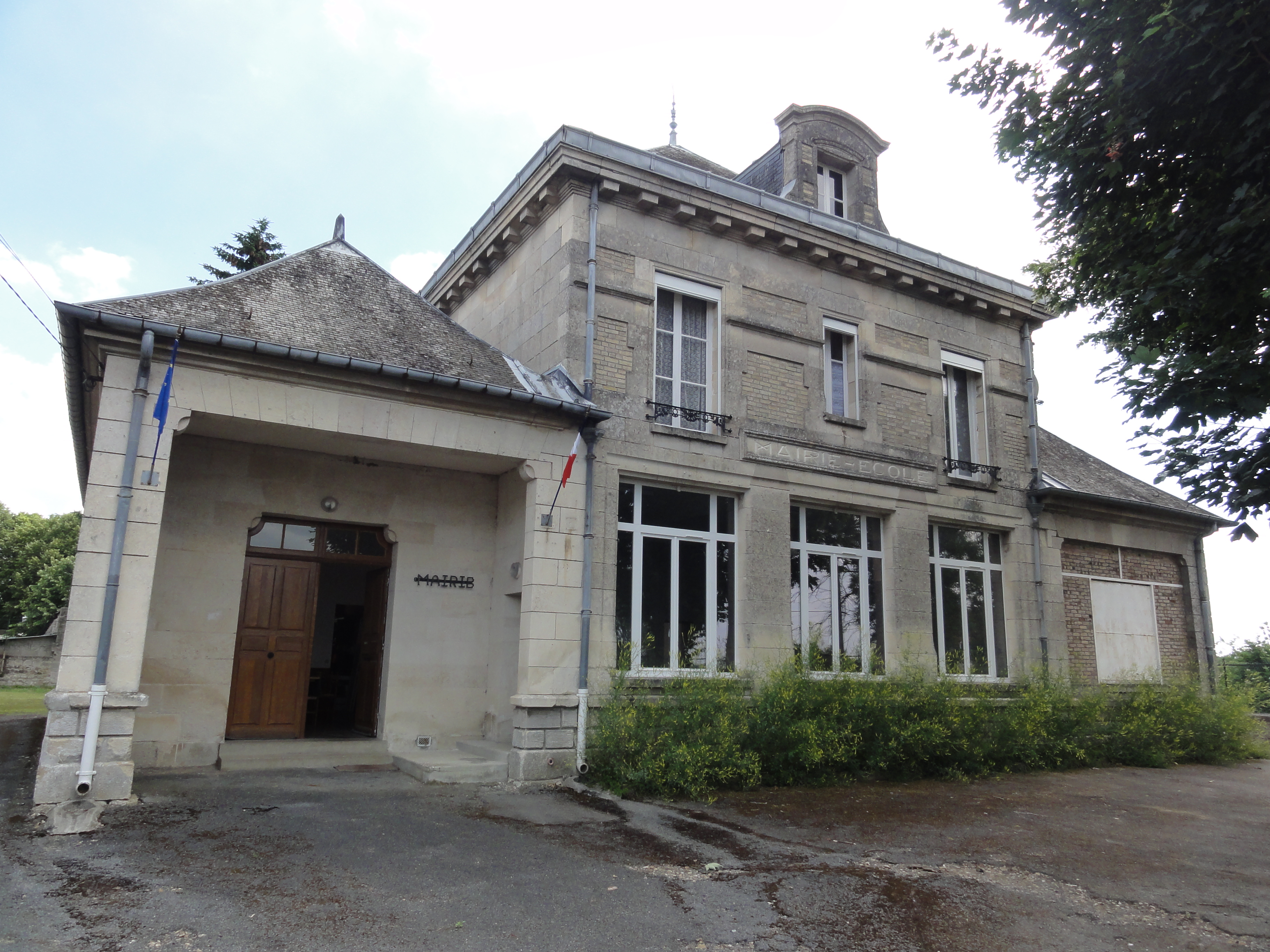
- The town hall and school of Chavigny
- Location of Chavigny
- Location within France Location within Hauts-de-France
- Coordinates: 49°25′33″N 3°18′20″E
- Country: France
- Region: Hauts-de-France
- Department: Aisne
- Arrondissement: Soissons
- Canton: Soissons-1
- Intercommunality: GrandSoissons Agglomération

Government
  - Mayor (2026–32): Didier Desprez
- Area^{1}: 5.28 km^{2} (2.04 sq mi)
- Highest elevation: 156 m (512 ft)
- Lowest elevation: 60 m (200 ft)
- Population (2023): 153
  - Density: 29.0/km^{2} (75.1/sq mi)
- Time zone: UTC+01:00 (CET)
  - Summer (DST): UTC+02:00 (CEST)
- INSEE/Postal code: 02175 /02880
- ^{1} French Land Register data, which excludes lakes, ponds, glaciers > 1 km^{2} (0.386 sq mi or 247 acres) and river estuaries.

Chavigny (French pronunciation: [ʃaviɲi]) is a commune in the Aisne department in Hauts-de-France in northern France.

== Population ==
Historical population
Year	Pop.	±% p.a.
1968	148	—
1975	133	−1.52%
1982	166	+3.22%
1990	159	−0.54%
1999	153	−0.43%
2007	154	+0.08%
2012	142	−1.61%
2017	150	+1.10%
2023	153	+0.33%
Source: INSEE

== See also ==
- Communes of the Aisne department
