= Vauxrezis =

- Commune
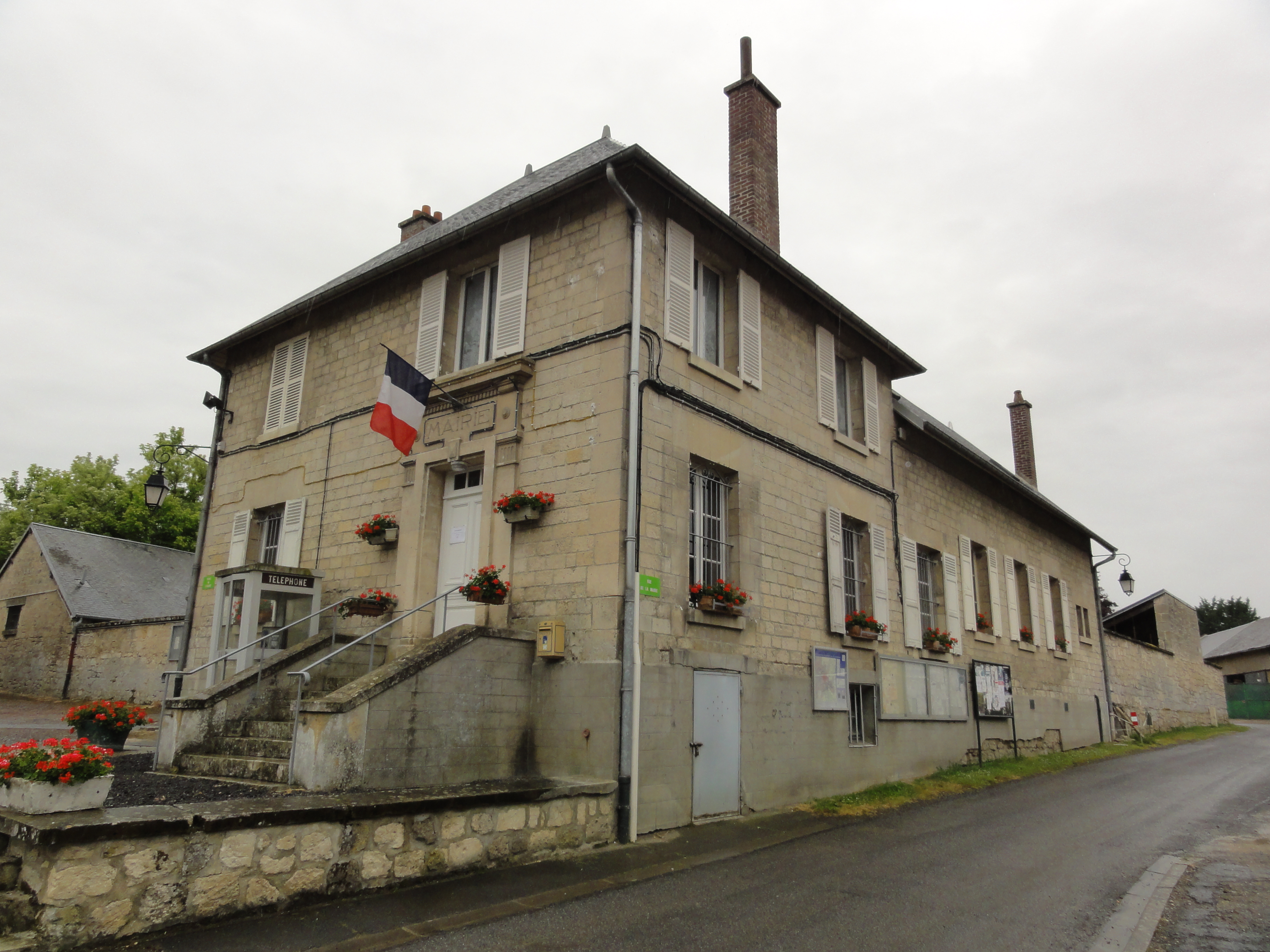
- The town hall of Vauxrezis
- Location of Vauxrezis
- Location within France Location within Hauts-de-France
- Coordinates: 49°24′51″N 3°16′54″E
- Country: France
- Region: Hauts-de-France
- Department: Aisne
- Arrondissement: Soissons
- Canton: Soissons-1
- Intercommunality: GrandSoissons Agglomération

Government
  - Mayor (2026–32): Marc Couteau
- Area^{1}: 6.54 km^{2} (2.53 sq mi)
- Elevation: 70 m (230 ft)
- Highest elevation: 162 m (531 ft)
- Lowest elevation: 48 m (157 ft)
- Population (2023): 323
  - Density: 49.4/km^{2} (128/sq mi)
- Time zone: UTC+01:00 (CET)
  - Summer (DST): UTC+02:00 (CEST)
- INSEE/Postal code: 02767 /02200
- ^{1} French Land Register data, which excludes lakes, ponds, glaciers > 1 km^{2} (0.386 sq mi or 247 acres) and river estuaries.

Vauxrezis is a commune in the Aisne department in Hauts-de-France in northern France.

== Population ==
Historical population
Year	Pop.	±% p.a.
1968	170	—
1975	184	+1.14%
1982	335	+8.94%
1990	347	+0.44%
1999	355	+0.25%
2007	326	−1.06%
2012	335	+0.55%
2017	324	−0.67%
2023	323	−0.05%
Source: INSEE

== See also ==
- Communes of the Aisne department
