= Pommiers, Aisne =

Pommiers
- Commune
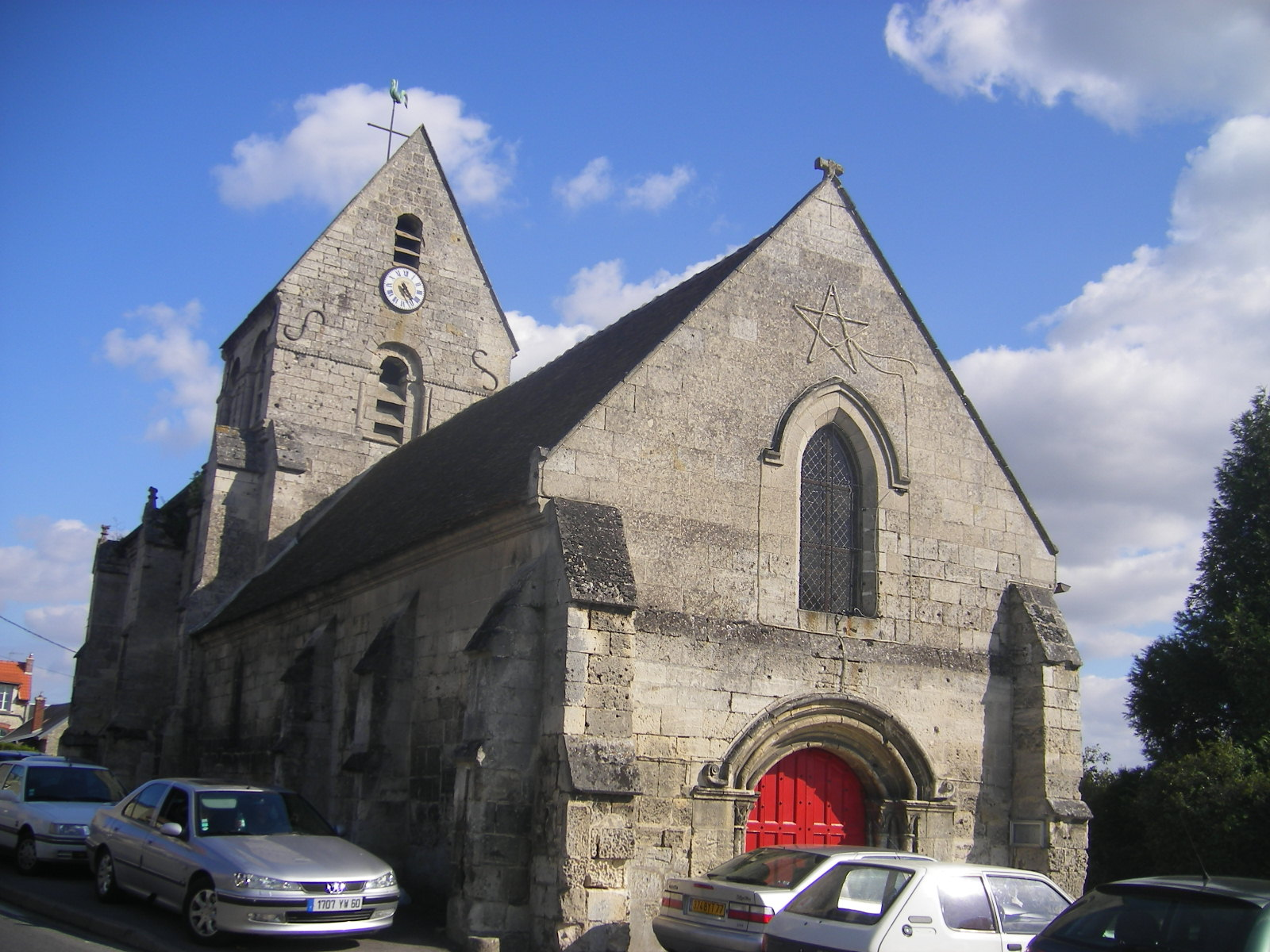
- The church of Pommiers
- Location of Pommiers
- Location within France Location within Hauts-de-France
- Coordinates: 49°23′38″N 3°16′16″E
- Country: France
- Region: Hauts-de-France
- Department: Aisne
- Arrondissement: Soissons
- Canton: Soissons-1
- Intercommunality: GrandSoissons Agglomération

Government
  - Mayor (2026–32): Anthony Grando
- Area^{1}: 6.69 km^{2} (2.58 sq mi)
- Elevation: 43 m (141 ft)
- Highest elevation: 134 m (440 ft)
- Lowest elevation: 38 m (125 ft)
- Population (2023): 726
  - Density: 109/km^{2} (281/sq mi)
- Time zone: UTC+01:00 (CET)
  - Summer (DST): UTC+02:00 (CEST)
- INSEE/Postal code: 02610 /02200
- ^{1} French Land Register data, which excludes lakes, ponds, glaciers > 1 km^{2} (0.386 sq mi or 247 acres) and river estuaries.

Pommiers (French pronunciation: [pɔmje]) is a commune in the Aisne department in Hauts-de-France in northern France.

== Population ==
Historical population
| Year | Pop. | ±% p.a. |
|---|---|---|
| 1968 | 437 | — |
| 1975 | 443 | +0.19% |
| 1982 | 587 | +4.10% |
| 1990 | 646 | +1.20% |
| 1999 | 601 | −0.80% |
| 2007 | 622 | +0.43% |
| 2012 | 616 | −0.19% |
| 2017 | 688 | +2.24% |
| 2023 | 726 | +0.90% |
Source: INSEE

== See also ==
- Communes of the Aisne department
