= Pasly =

- Commune
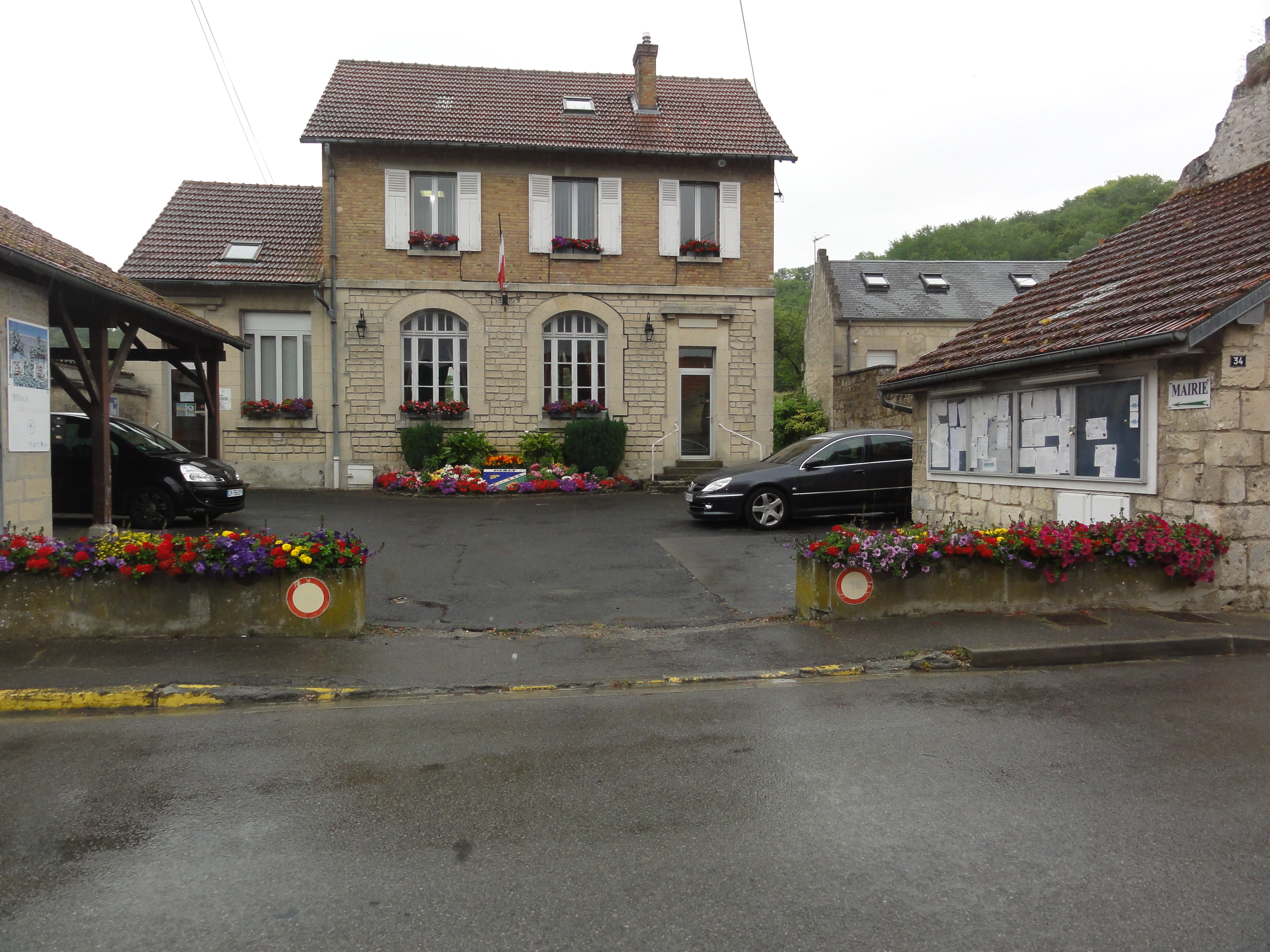
- The town hall of Pasly

- Coat of arms
- Location of Pasly
- Location within France Location within Hauts-de-France
- Coordinates: 49°24′09″N 3°17′50″E
- Country: France
- Region: Hauts-de-France
- Department: Aisne
- Arrondissement: Soissons
- Canton: Soissons-1
- Intercommunality: GrandSoissons Agglomération

Government
  - Mayor (2026–32): Olivier Carlier
- Area^{1}: 3.02 km^{2} (1.17 sq mi)
- Elevation: 50 m (160 ft)
- Highest elevation: 149 m (489 ft)
- Lowest elevation: 38 m (125 ft)
- Population (2023): 1,100
  - Density: 360/km^{2} (940/sq mi)
- Time zone: UTC+01:00 (CET)
  - Summer (DST): UTC+02:00 (CEST)
- INSEE/Postal code: 02593 /02200
- ^{1} French Land Register data, which excludes lakes, ponds, glaciers > 1 km^{2} (0.386 sq mi or 247 acres) and river estuaries.

Pasly (French pronunciation: [pali]) is a commune in the Aisne department in Hauts-de-France in northern France.

== Population ==
Historical population
Year	Pop.	±% p.a.
1968	558	—
1975	902	+7.10%
1982	1,018	+1.74%
1990	1,119	+1.19%
1999	1,067	−0.53%
2007	1,015	−0.62%
2012	1,022	+0.14%
2017	1,019	−0.06%
2023	1,100	+1.28%
Source: INSEE

== See also ==
- Communes of the Aisne department
