= Cuisy-en-Almont =

- Commune
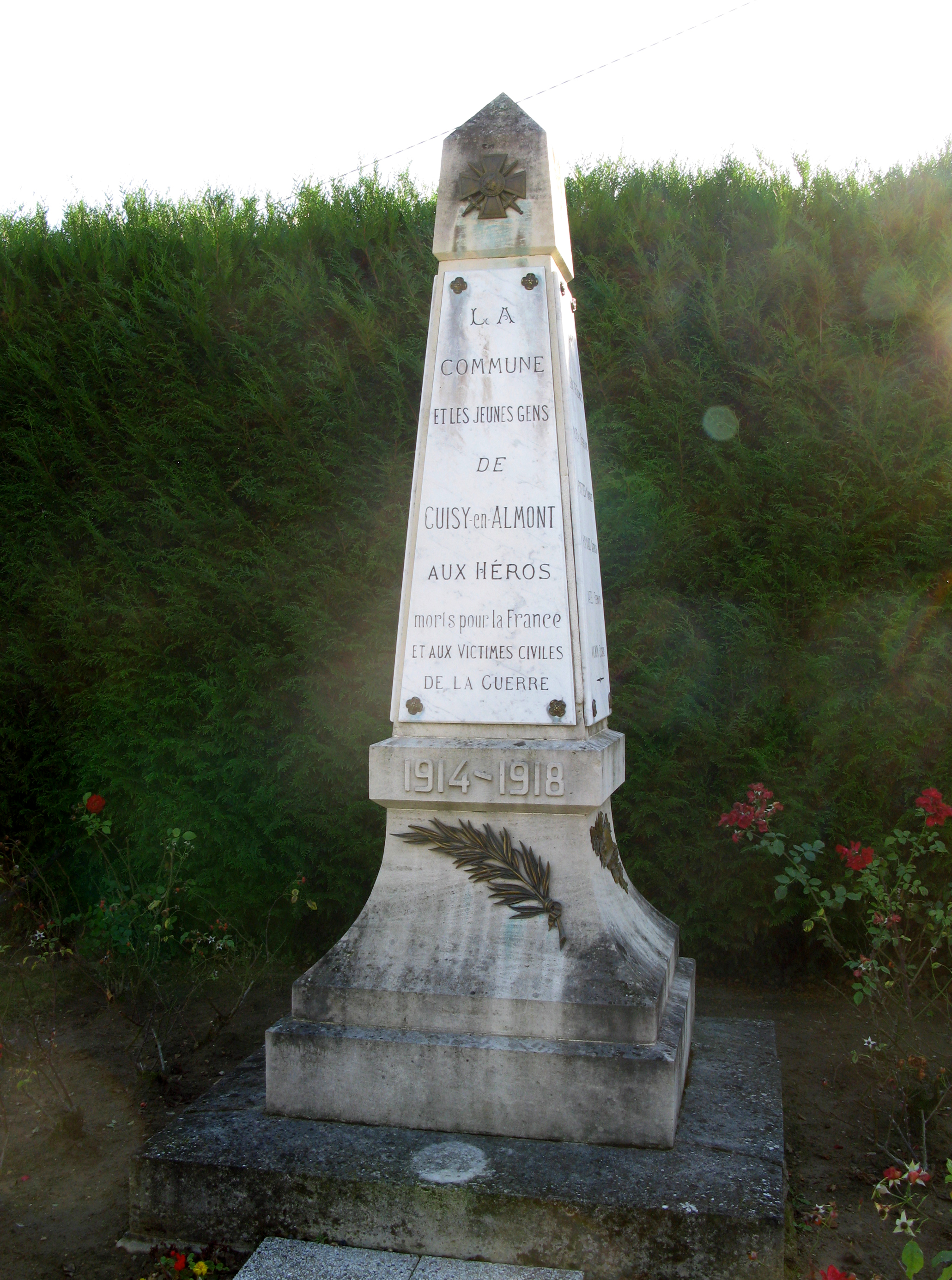
- War memorial
- Location of Cuisy-en-Almont
- Location within France Location within Hauts-de-France
- Coordinates: 49°25′06″N 3°14′48″E
- Country: France
- Region: Hauts-de-France
- Department: Aisne
- Arrondissement: Soissons
- Canton: Soissons-1
- Intercommunality: GrandSoissons Agglomération

Government
  - Mayor (2026–32): Françoise Champenois
- Area^{1}: 9.17 km^{2} (3.54 sq mi)
- Elevation: 144 m (472 ft)
- Highest elevation: 153 m (502 ft)
- Lowest elevation: 44 m (144 ft)
- Population (2023): 361
  - Density: 39.4/km^{2} (102/sq mi)
- Time zone: UTC+01:00 (CET)
  - Summer (DST): UTC+02:00 (CEST)
- INSEE/Postal code: 02253 /02200
- ^{1} French Land Register data, which excludes lakes, ponds, glaciers > 1 km^{2} (0.386 sq mi or 247 acres) and river estuaries.

Cuisy-en-Almont (French pronunciation: [kɥizi ɑ̃.n‿almɔ̃]) is a commune in the Aisne department in Hauts-de-France in northern France.

== Population ==
Historical population
Year	Pop.	±% p.a.
1968	433	—
1975	371	−2.18%
1982	311	−2.49%
1990	321	+0.40%
1999	352	+1.03%
2007	331	−0.77%
2012	332	+0.06%
2017	355	+1.35%
2023	361	+0.28%
Source: INSEE

== See also ==
- Communes of the Aisne department
