= Canton of Soissons-1 =

Coordinates: 49.39°N 3.33°E

Soissons-1
- Canton
- Interactive map of Soissons-1
- Country: France
- Region: Hauts-de-France
- Department: Aisne
- No. of communes: {{{nbcomm}}}
- Area: 89.30 km^{2} (34.48 sq mi)
- Population (2023): 22,774
  - Density: 255.0/km^{2} (660.5/sq mi)
- INSEE code: 02 16

The canton of Soissons-1 (before 2015: Soissons-Nord) is an administrative division in northern France. It consists of the northern part of the town of Soissons and its northern suburbs. At the French canton reorganisation which came into effect in March 2015, the canton was expanded from 11 to 15 communes:

1. Bagneux
2. Chavigny
3. Crouy
4. Cuffies
5. Cuisy-en-Almont
6. Juvigny
7. Leury
8. Osly-Courtil
9. Pasly
10. Pommiers
11. Soissons (partly)
12. Vauxrezis
13. Venizel
14. Villeneuve-Saint-Germain
15. Vregny

== Demographics ==
Historical population
Year	Pop.	±% p.a.
2013	23,043	—
2018	23,045	+0.00%
Source: INSEE

== See also ==
- Cantons of the Aisne department
- Communes of France
