= Crouy =

- Commune
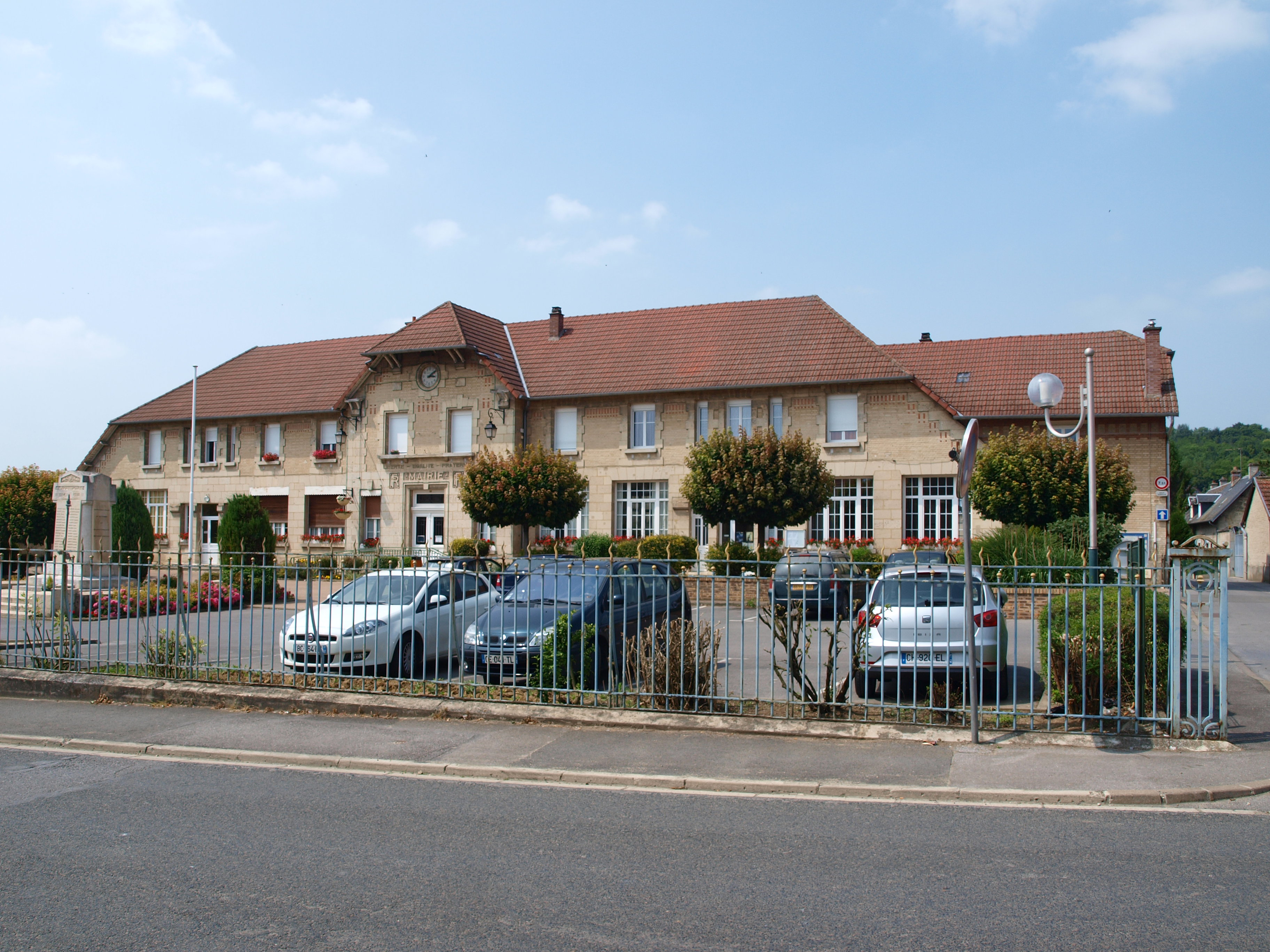
- The town hall of Crouy

- Coat of arms
- Location of Crouy
- Location within France Location within Hauts-de-France
- Coordinates: 49°24′09″N 3°21′36″E
- Country: France
- Region: Hauts-de-France
- Department: Aisne
- Arrondissement: Soissons
- Canton: Soissons-1
- Intercommunality: GrandSoissons Agglomération

Government
  - Mayor (2026–32): Aurélie Decarnelle
- Area^{1}: 10.38 km^{2} (4.01 sq mi)
- Elevation: 55 m (180 ft)
- Highest elevation: 165 m (541 ft)
- Lowest elevation: 40 m (130 ft)
- Population (2023): 3,049
  - Density: 293.7/km^{2} (760.8/sq mi)
- Time zone: UTC+01:00 (CET)
  - Summer (DST): UTC+02:00 (CEST)
- INSEE/Postal code: 02243 /02880
- ^{1} French Land Register data, which excludes lakes, ponds, glaciers > 1 km^{2} (0.386 sq mi or 247 acres) and river estuaries.

Crouy (French pronunciation: [kʁui]) is a commune in the Aisne department in Hauts-de-France in northern France.

== Population ==
Historical population

Year	Pop.	±% p.a.
1793	925	—
1800	955	+0.46%
1806	903	−0.93%
1821	966	+0.45%
1831	1,124	+1.53%
1836	1,135	+0.19%
1841	1,147	+0.21%
1846	1,145	−0.03%
1851	1,127	−0.32%
1856	1,048	−1.44%
1861	1,085	+0.70%
1866	1,169	+1.50%
1872	1,152	−0.24%
1876	1,208	+1.19%
1881	1,239	+0.51%
1886	1,348	+1.70%
1891	1,362	+0.21%
1896	1,405	+0.62%
1901	1,386	−0.27%

Year	Pop.	±% p.a.
1906	1,418	+0.46%
1911	1,482	+0.89%
1921	1,010	−3.76%
1926	1,741	+11.51%
1931	1,865	+1.39%
1936	1,954	+0.94%
1946	2,007	+0.27%
1954	2,185	+1.07%
1962	2,781	+3.06%
1968	3,031	+1.45%
1975	3,058	+0.13%
1982	2,960	−0.46%
1990	2,819	−0.61%
1999	2,619	−0.81%
2007	2,653	+0.16%
2012	2,801	+1.09%
2017	2,905	+0.73%
2023	3,049	+0.81%

Source: EHESS and INSEE (1968-2023)

== See also ==
- Communes of the Aisne department
