= Juvigny, Aisne =

Juvigny
- Commune
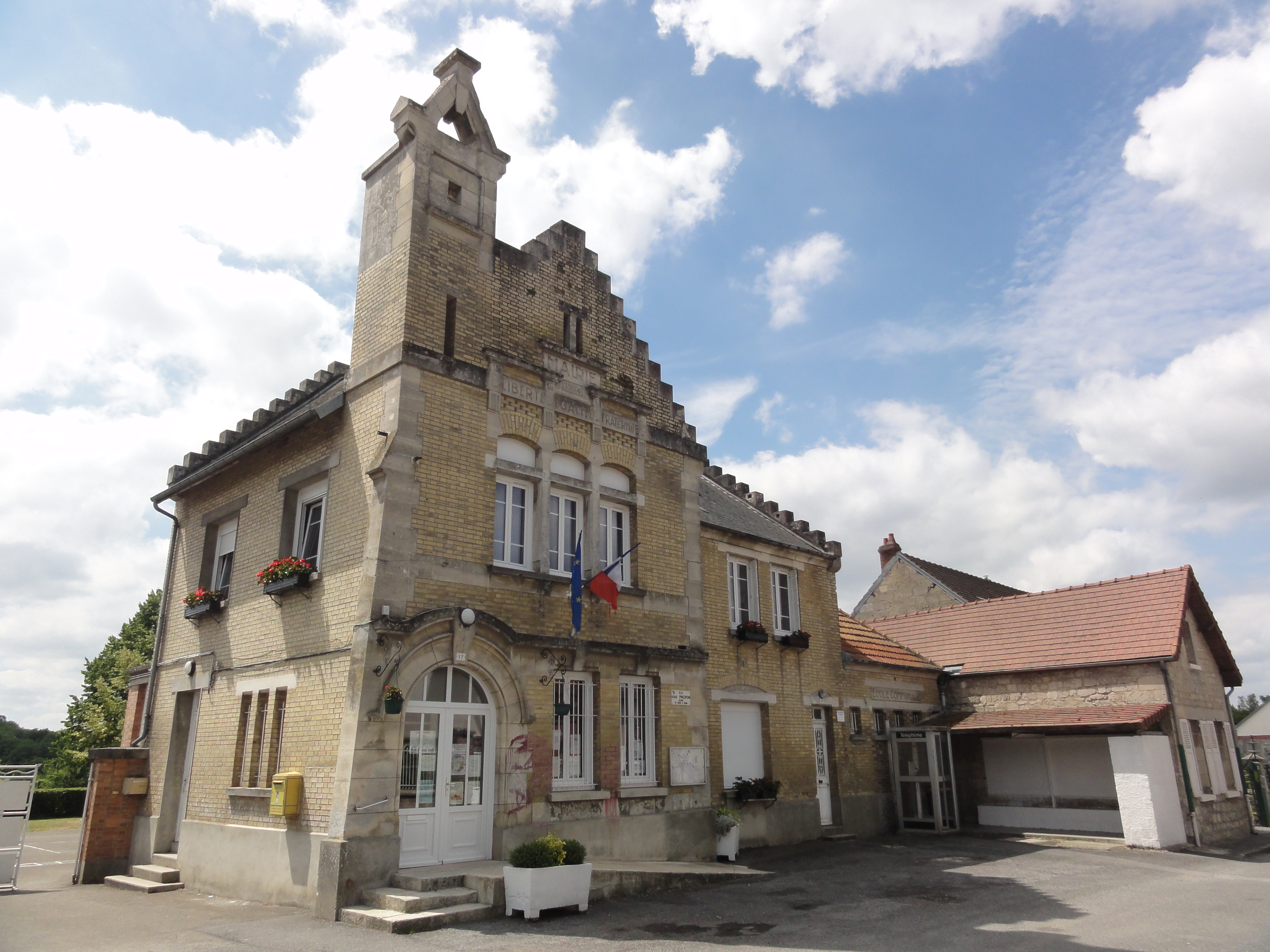
- The town hall of Juvigny
- Location of Juvigny
- Location within France Location within Hauts-de-France
- Coordinates: 49°26′54″N 3°19′09″E
- Country: France
- Region: Hauts-de-France
- Department: Aisne
- Arrondissement: Soissons
- Canton: Soissons-1
- Intercommunality: GrandSoissons Agglomération

Government
  - Mayor (2026–32): Patrick Dumaire
- Area^{1}: 13.85 km^{2} (5.35 sq mi)
- Elevation: 134 m (440 ft)
- Highest elevation: 166 m (545 ft)
- Lowest elevation: 69 m (226 ft)
- Population (2023): 288
  - Density: 20.8/km^{2} (53.9/sq mi)
- Time zone: UTC+01:00 (CET)
  - Summer (DST): UTC+02:00 (CEST)
- INSEE/Postal code: 02398 /02880
- ^{1} French Land Register data, which excludes lakes, ponds, glaciers > 1 km^{2} (0.386 sq mi or 247 acres) and river estuaries.

Juvigny (French pronunciation: [ʒyviɲi]) is a commune in the Aisne department in Hauts-de-France in northern France.

== Population ==
Historical population
Year	Pop.	±% p.a.
1968	350	—
1975	299	−2.22%
1982	298	−0.05%
1990	283	−0.64%
1999	275	−0.32%
2007	287	+0.54%
2012	290	+0.21%
2017	277	−0.91%
2023	288	+0.65%
Source: INSEE

== See also ==
- Communes of the Aisne department
