= Aisne-Marne Canal =

Canal in northeastern France

Coordinates: 49.3989°N 3.9053°E

Canal de l'Aisne à la Marne
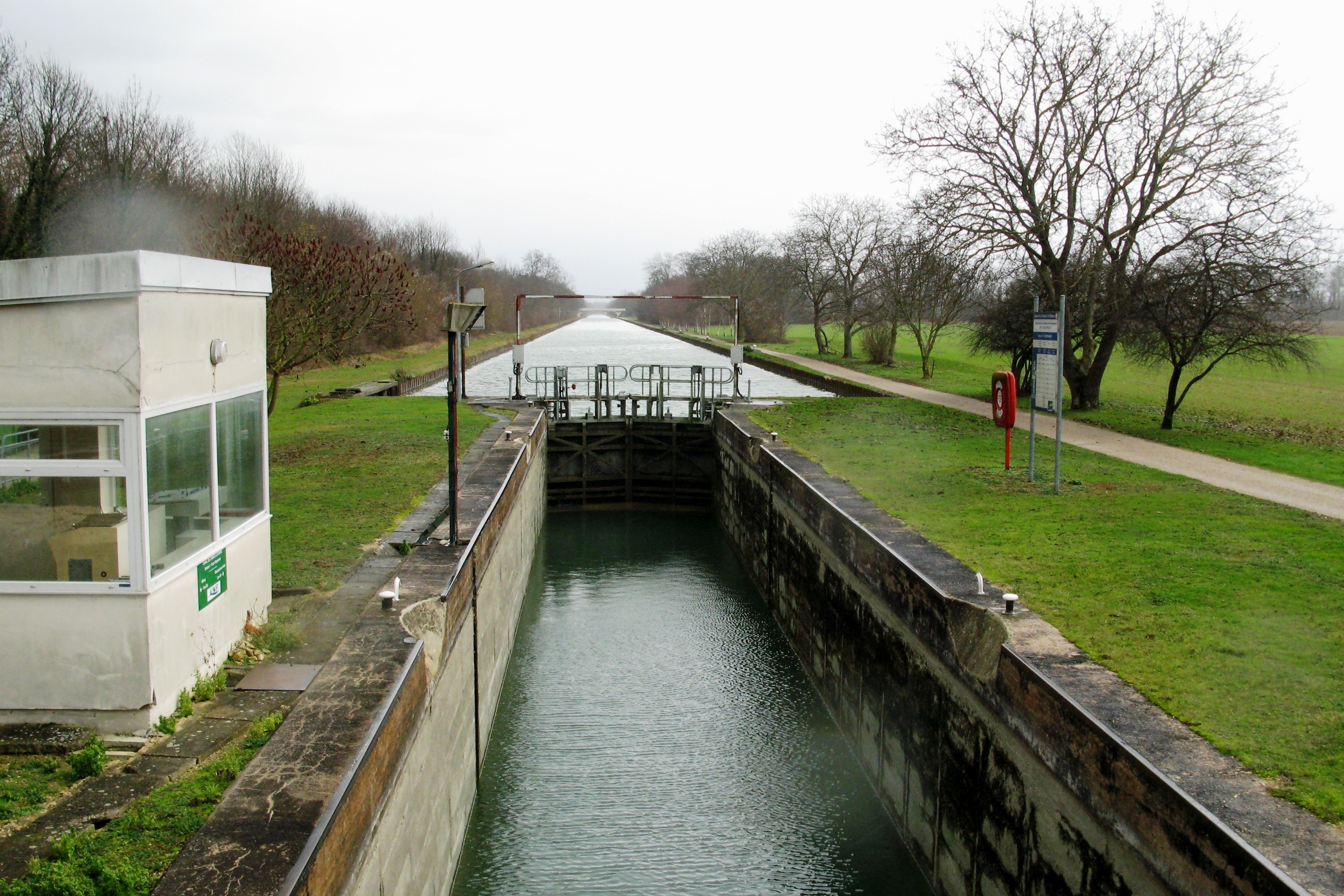
- Lock 14 on Canal de l'Aisne à la Marne
- Interactive map of Canal de l'Aisne à la Marne

Specifications
- Length: 58.109 km (36.107 miles)
- Locks: 24

History
- Date completed: 1866

The Canal de l’Aisne à la Marne (French pronunciation: [kanal də lɛn a la maʁn], literally Canal of the Aisne to the Marne) is a canal in northeastern France which connects the Aisne and the Marne valleys. It runs from the Canal latéral à l'Aisne at Berry-au-Bac to Condé-sur-Marne on the Canal latéral à la Marne, a distance of 58 km. The canal rises 40m through 16 locks via the cathedral city of Reims, which is also a busy commercial port, to a summit level at an altitude of 95.70m. After crossing the watershed through a tunnel 2302m long at Mont-de-Billy, the canal drops down 23.80m through a flight of 8 locks towards the Marne.

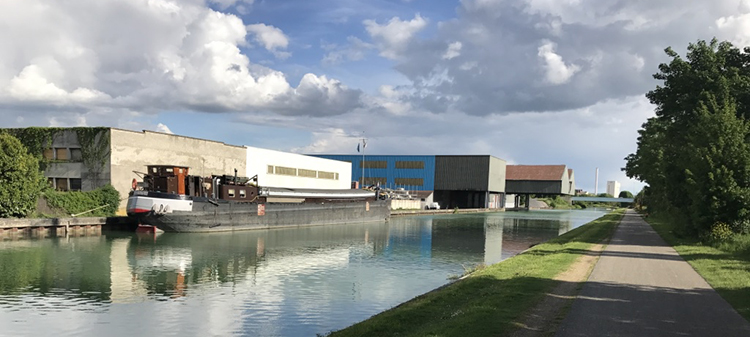
38m péniche waiting to load in the port of Reims

== History ==
Engineer Hugues Cosnier built the first canal between Reims and Sillery in the early 17th century. This was part of a grand plan to build canals by-passing Paris to the east. Work on this link followed those on the Canal latéral à l'Aisne, starting in 1841. The canal was opened in 1866. It was later planned to implement Cosnier’s idea of an orbital route from the Loire through to northern France. Only the north-south section was built, comprising this link and the Canal de l'Oise à l'Aisne. In the 1990s it was envisaged to rebuild the canal to European Class IV or V dimensions to an enlarged port in Reims. This would have been the first section of a possible Seine-Est waterway linking with the Moselle. Both projects were subsequently abandoned.

== Navigation ==
The route is still used by about 10 péniches per day, with grain as the principal traffic, while recreational traffic is mainly private boats in transit. The towpath is increasingly popular with hikers and cyclists, especially in the metropolitan area of Reims.
