= Saint-Quentin Canal =

Canal in northern France

Canal de Saint-Quentin
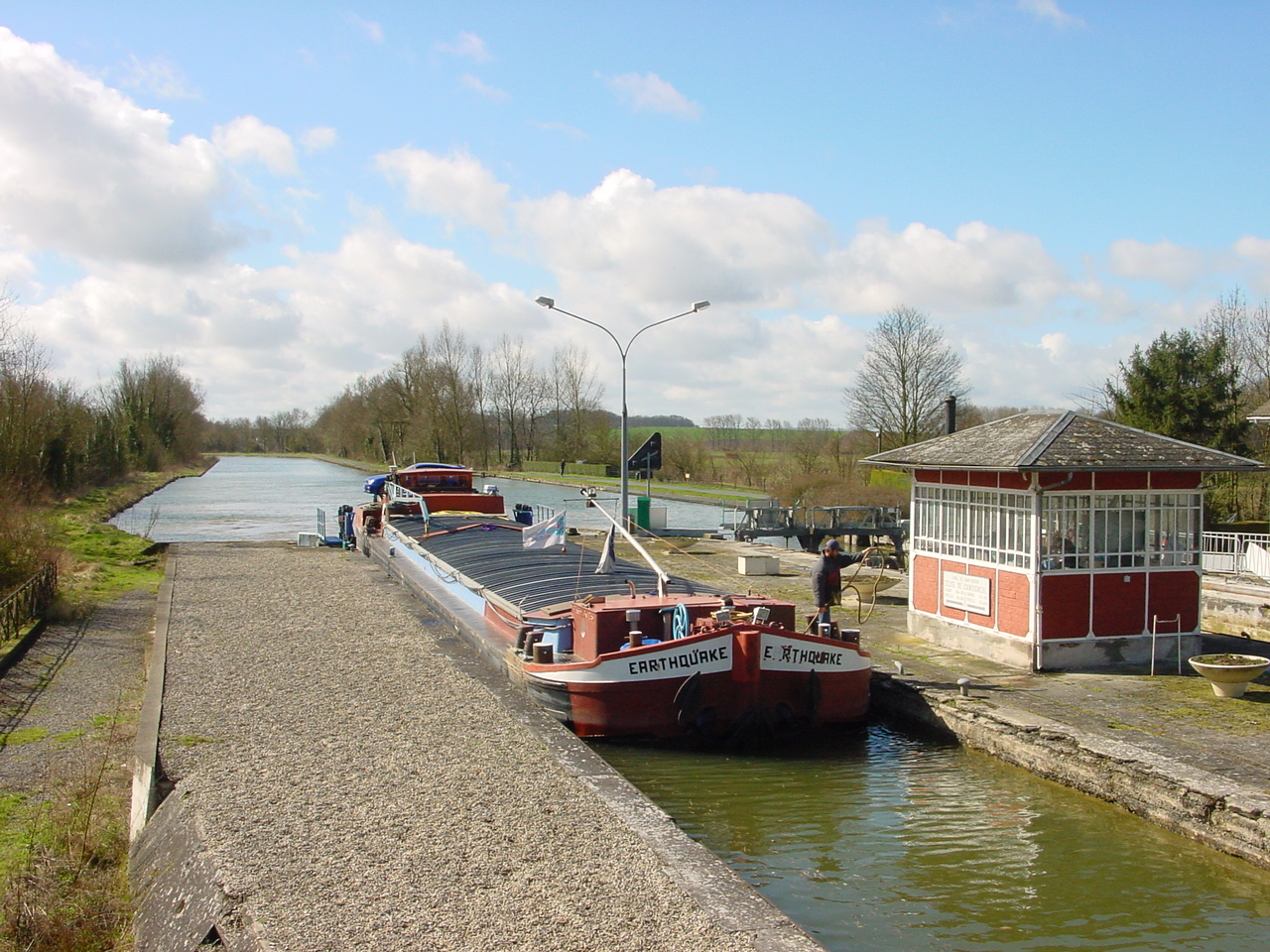
- Lock Noyelles-sur-Escaut on Canal Saint-Quentin
- Interactive map of Canal de Saint-Quentin

Specifications
- Length: 92.5 km (57.5 mi)
- Maximum boat length: 38.50 m (126.3 ft)
- Maximum boat beam: 5.05 m (16.6 ft)
- Minimum boat draft: 2.20 m (7.2 ft)
- Minimum boat air draft: 3.50 m (11.5 ft)
- Locks: 35
- Total rise: 43 m
- Status: Open

History
- Former names: Canal Crozat or Canal de Picardie between Chauny and Saint-Simon, in 1738
- Current owner: Voies Navigables de France
- Principal engineer: Original engineer named Devicq in 1727. Died in 1742.
- Other engineer: Revised plan by Laurent de Lyonne. Work began in 1768.
- Date completed: 1810

Geography
- Start point: Canalised Escaut River (Scheldt) in Cambrai
- End point: Chauny
- Beginning coordinates: 50.17646°N 3.22173°E
- Ending coordinates: 49.60814°N 3.22526°E
- Connects to: Canal latéral à l'Oise; Canal de l'Oise à l'Aisne; Canal de la Sambre à l'Oise; Canalised Escaut River

The Canal de Saint-Quentin (French pronunciation: [kanal də sɛ̃ kɑ̃tɛ̃]) is a canal in northern France connecting the canalised river Escaut in Cambrai to the Canal latéral à l'Oise and Canal de l'Oise à l'Aisne in Chauny.

== History ==
The canal was built in two phases, the second much longer than the first. King Louis XIV's ministers Colbert and Mazarin had both proposed linking the rivers Oise and Somme in the 17th century and this resulted in the Canal Crozat, or Canal de Picardie, between Chauny and Saint-Simon in 1738. The remainder, connecting the Seine Basin with the Escaut was a lengthy process. The original designer, Devicq in 1727, died in 1742. Little was accomplished until Napoleon demanded that work begin again in 1801. He officiated at the opening in April 1810.

The canal was such a success that the locks had to be duplicated throughout in the early 20th century, at the same time deepening the channel, enlarging the tunnels, and increasing water supplies. Later improvements included electric barge traction on rails, installed during World War I, mechanising locks, and providing public lighting on the busiest sections. Later, the locks were equipped for automatic operation, using remote sensors, and more recently, using handheld remote control. By 1878, up to 110 barges were crossing the summit level daily. The Canal du Nord was built as a duplicate route and completed in 1965. The canal carried more freight than any other man-made waterway in France in 1964.

=== Battle of St Quentin Canal ===
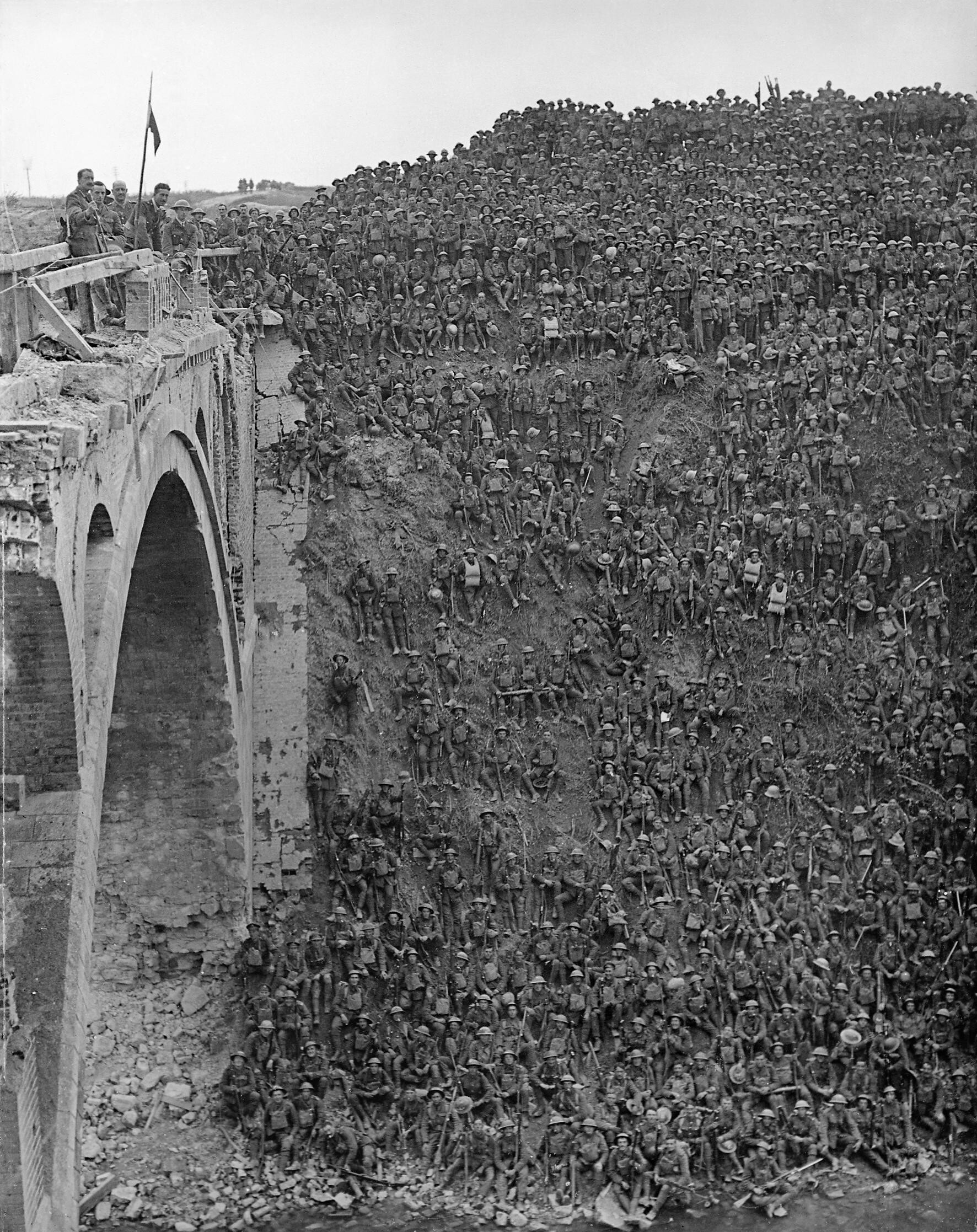
Brigadier General J. V. Campbell addressing British troops of the 137th Brigade (46th Division) from the Riqueval Bridge over the Canal in 1918

The Canal in World War I formed part of the Hindenburg Line, a German defensive position built during the winter of 1916–1917. The Allied crossing of the Saint-Quentin Canal in 1918 was a significant part of the Hundred Days Offensive that led to the Armistice.

== Navigation ==
This canal is an asset for tourism, boating and on the towpath, especially the northern section in the Escaut valley, the spectacular summit level with its tunnels and the boat harbour in the basin at Saint-Quentin. Commercial traffic declined after opening of the Canal du Nord, and it is now consistently quiet and peaceful, although a few Freycinet barges still use this route.

== En route ==
- PK 0 Cambrai
- PK 11 Masnières
- PK 18 Les Rues-des-Vignes
- PK 23 Honnecourt-sur-Escaut
- PK 28.5-35 Riqueval Tunnel (5670m) Bony
- PK 42-43 Tronquoy Tunnel (1098m) Lesdins
- PK 53 Saint-Quentin
- PK 62 Séraucourt-le-Grand
- PK 68 Right Petite Somme: Saint-Simon to Ham, closed 2006 (link to Canal de la Somme), route continues left
- PK 80.5 Voyaux
- PK 83 Tergnier
- PK 85 T-junction left 3.8 km branch to Canal de la Sambre à l'Oise Right continues as Canal de Saint-Quentin
- PK 92 Chauny, the canal continues as Canal latéral à l'Oise towards Paris. Left Canal de l'Oise à l'Aisne
