= Aisne (disambiguation) =

Aisne may refer to:

- Aisne, a French department named after:
  - Aisne (river), left tributary of the river Oise
- Aisne River, Belgium, tributary of the river Ourthe
- Aisne's 1st constituency, a French legislative constituency in the Aisne département
- Battle of the Aisne (disambiguation), three different battles during World War I
- Canal latéral à l'Aisne, a canal in northern France, which connects Vieux-lès-Asfeld to Celles-sur-Aisne
- MV Aisne, a British coaster in service from 1950 to 1960
- SS Aisne (1918), a cargo ship ordered by Compagnie Générale Transatlantique during World War I but requisitioned on completion by the United States Shipping Board
