= Bourg-et-Comin =

- Commune
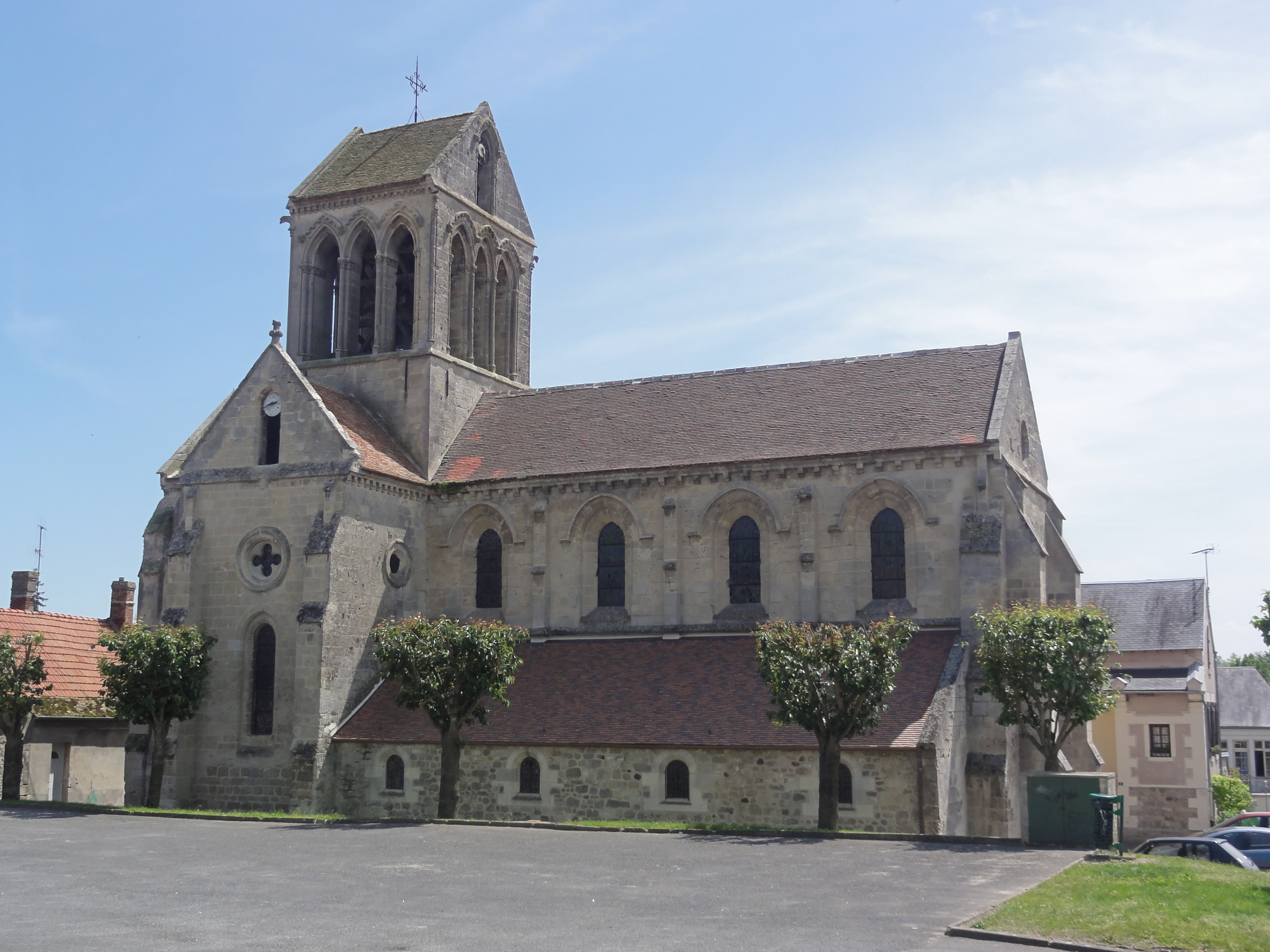
- The 12th century Church of St. Martin, Bourg-et-Comin
- Location of Bourg-et-Comin
- Location within France Location within Hauts-de-France
- Coordinates: 49°23′51″N 3°39′18″E
- Country: France
- Region: Hauts-de-France
- Department: Aisne
- Arrondissement: Laon
- Canton: Villeneuve-sur-Aisne
- Intercommunality: Chemin des Dames

Government
  - Mayor (2026–32): Christine Boin
- Area^{1}: 5.12 km^{2} (1.98 sq mi)
- Elevation: 63 m (207 ft)
- Highest elevation: 170 m (560 ft)
- Lowest elevation: 44 m (144 ft)
- Population (2023): 809
  - Density: 158/km^{2} (409/sq mi)
- Time zone: UTC+01:00 (CET)
  - Summer (DST): UTC+02:00 (CEST)
- INSEE/Postal code: 02106 /02160
- ^{1} French Land Register data, which excludes lakes, ponds, glaciers > 1 km^{2} (0.386 sq mi or 247 acres) and river estuaries.

Bourg-et-Comin (French pronunciation: [buʁ e kɔmɛ̃]) is a commune in the department of Aisne in Hauts-de-France in northern France.

== History ==
The area around Bourg et Comin has been occupied since Neolithic times with settlements along the River Aisne. The village grew as a fortified place on the road between Laon and Fismes .

The Church of St. Martin is a Romanesque church of the 12th century. It has been listed as an historical monument since 1919 . The tower is protected by a 13th century two-sided gable roof.

The whole of the surrounding area was part of a World War I battlefield and there are many military cemeteries in the area. The German army held the high ground to the north known as the Chemin des Dames and resisted two attacks by the French army to dislodge them in 1914 and 1917; and then used the high ground to launch a surprise offensive in 1918.

It was in this area that the first trenches were dug in the war and static trench warfare began.

== Geography ==
The nearby River Aisne drains into the basin of the river Seine and therefore Bourg-et-Comin is hydrologically part of the Paris Basin. It has an Oceanic climate in common with the rest of northern France. The low lying alluvial Aisne valley makes the landscape rich in lakes. The land rises to chalk hills in the north.

The village is located on the Aisne river's north bank. Its location is an historically important bridging point across the Aisne.

It also sits at the confluence of two nineteenth century canals. The Canal latéral à l'Aisne was completed in 1841 and carries traffic from the Ardenne into the Paris Basin. The Canal de l'Oise à l'Aisne was completed in 1890 as a summit crossing short link joining up with the Canal latéral à l'Oise 30 miles to the north.

.A railway was constructed along the Aisne valley in the 1870s. which gave the village a station and connected it with Paris.

The town is positioned near the border of the historical territory of Picardy to the north west and the former administrative region Champagne-Ardenne to the south east which mostly corresponds with the historic province of Champagne.

The town of Bourg-et-Comin is a member of the Chemin des Dames community of towns, established in 1995 for inter-municipal cooperation (EPCI) with its own tax system.

The modern French A26 autoroute motorway is 30 Km to the east

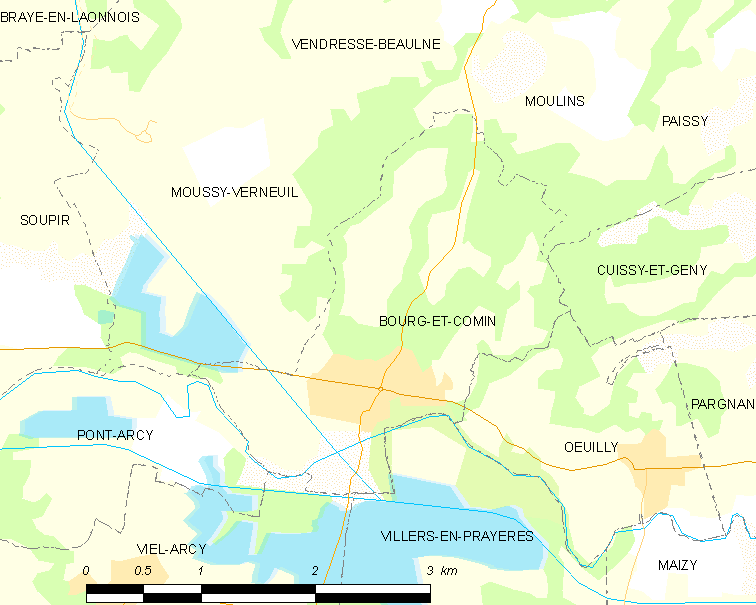
Map of the Bourg et Comin area.

== Population ==
Historical population
Year	Pop.	±% p.a.
1968	515	—
1975	563	+1.28%
1982	536	−0.70%
1990	535	−0.02%
1999	678	+2.67%
2007	738	+1.07%
2012	820	+2.13%
2017	822	+0.05%
2023	809	−0.27%
Source: INSEE

Residents are known as Bourcominois in French.

== Photo gallery ==
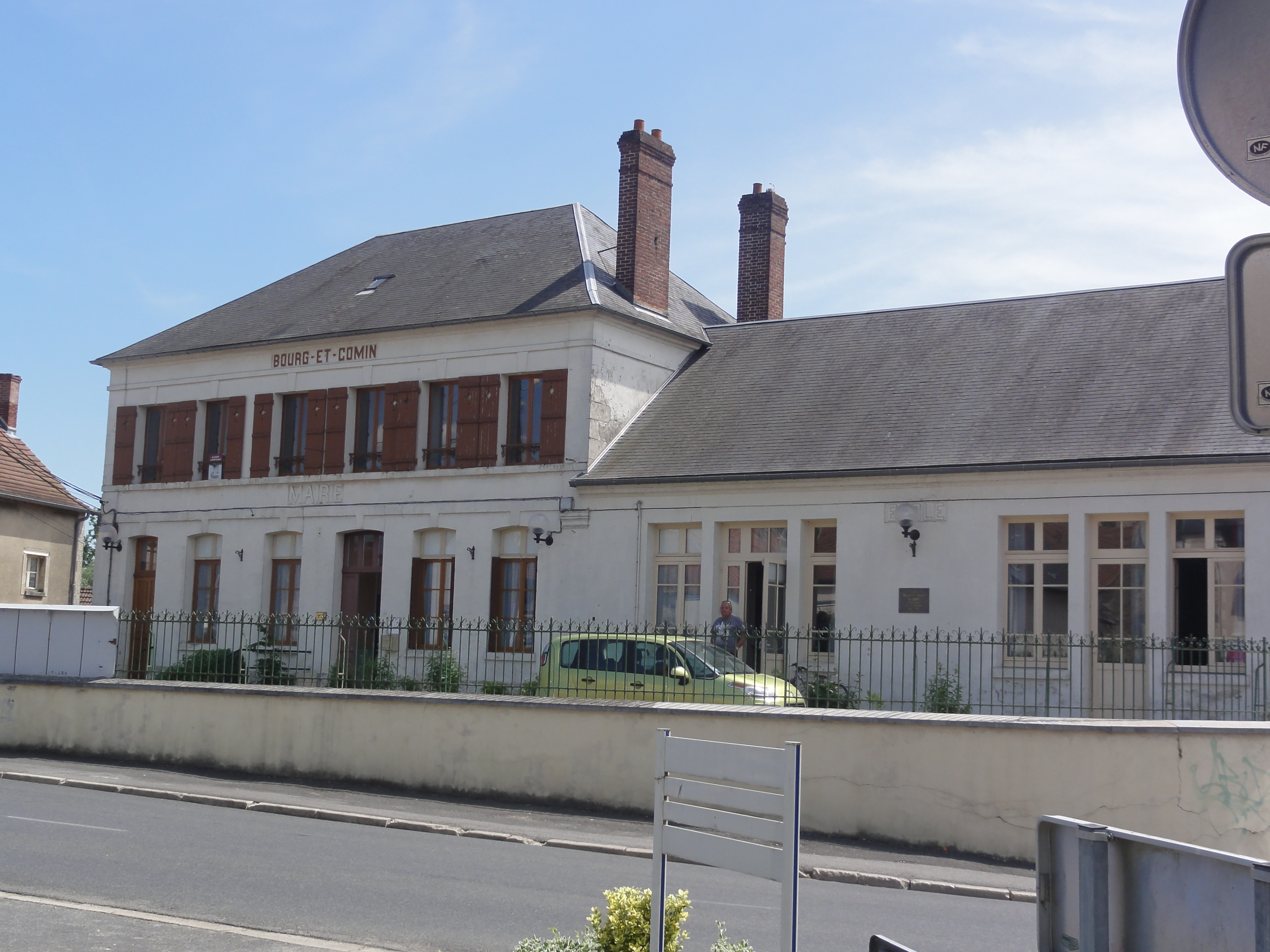
Town Hall, Mairie

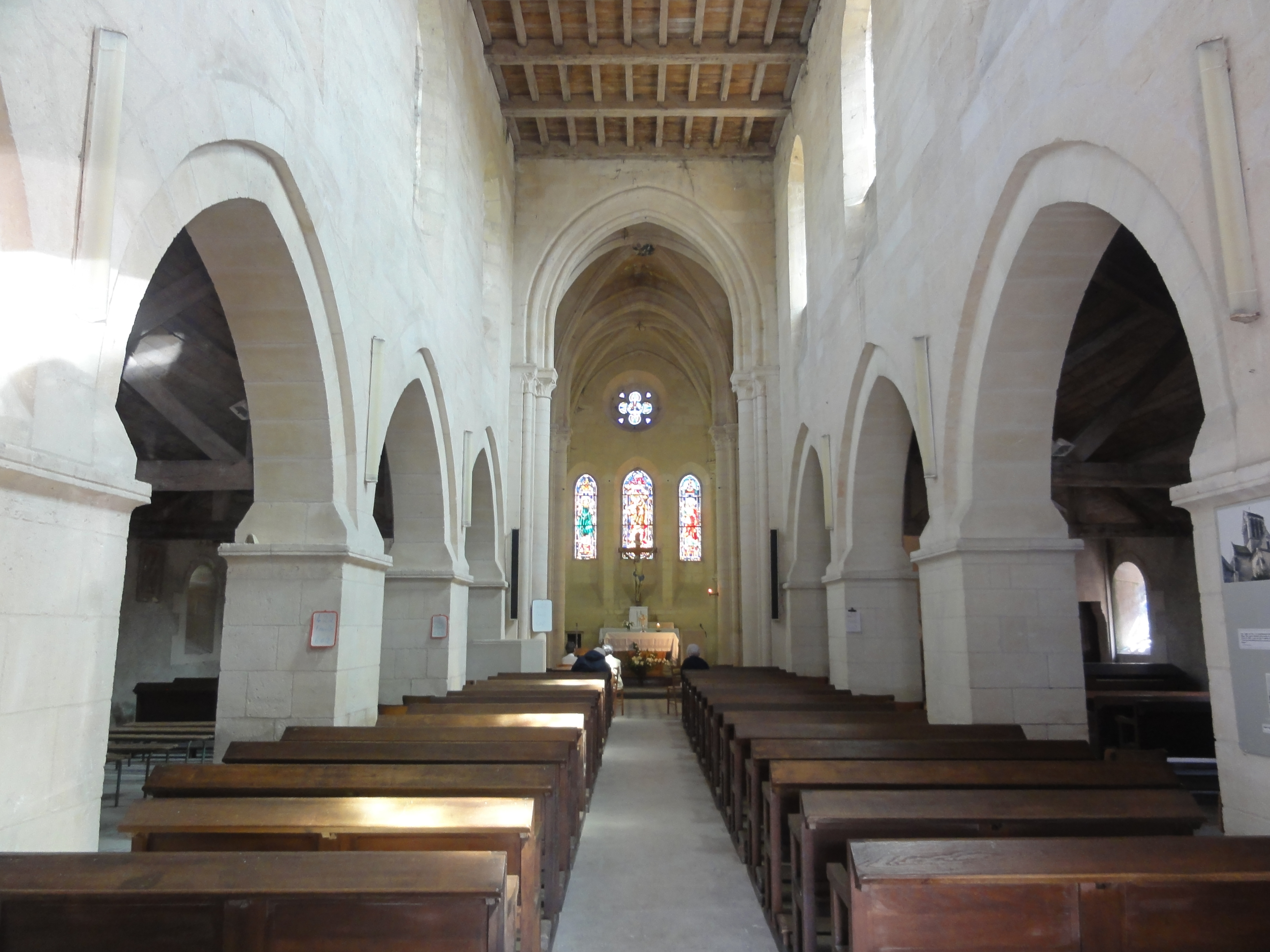
Church of St. Martin, interior

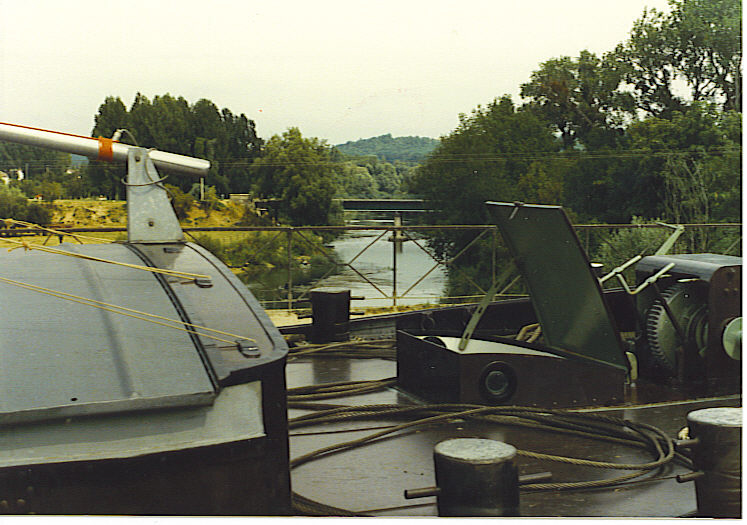
The Oise and Aisne canal at Bourg-et-Comin

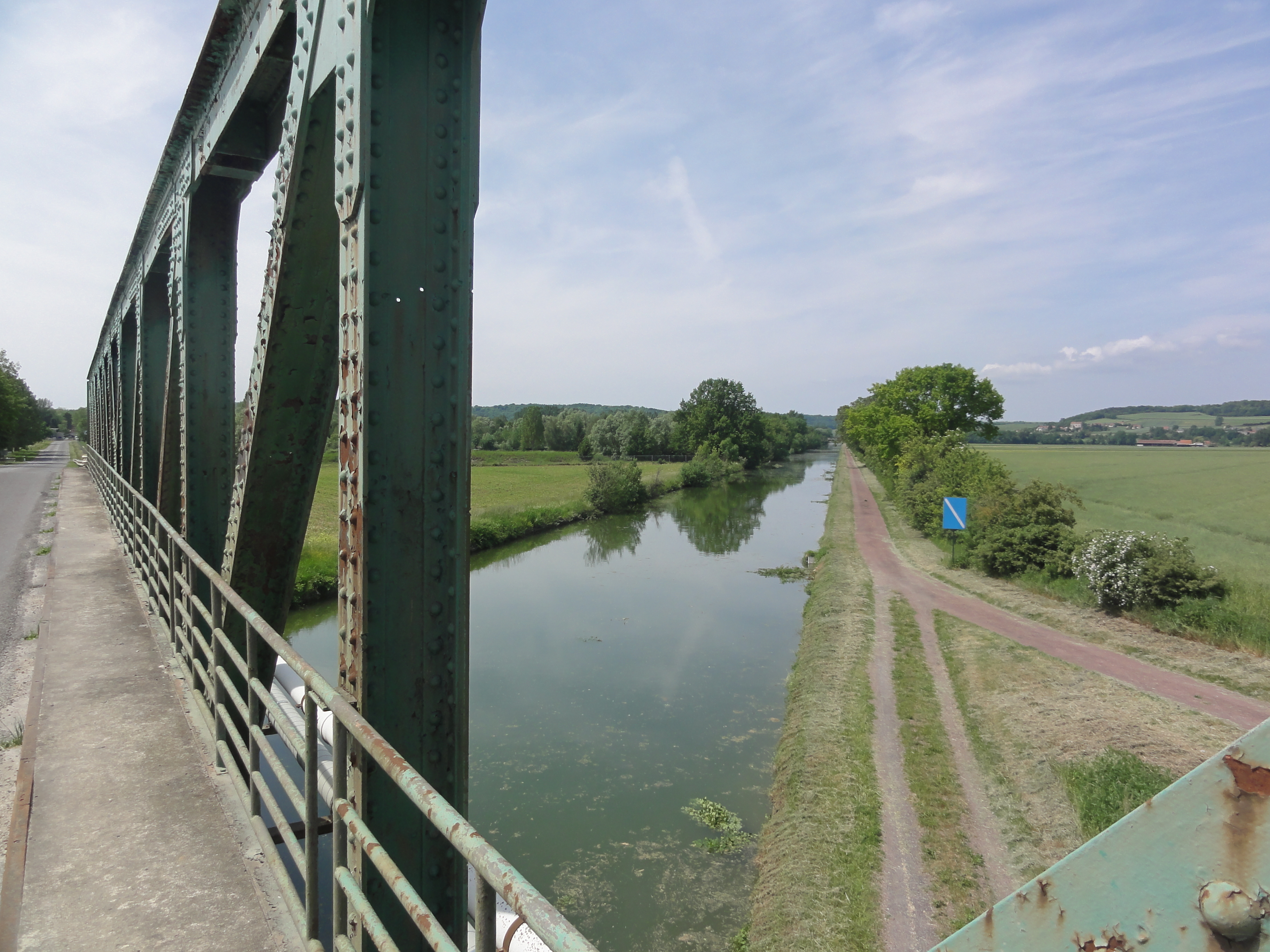
Bourg-et-Comin, Canal de l'Oise à l'Aisne

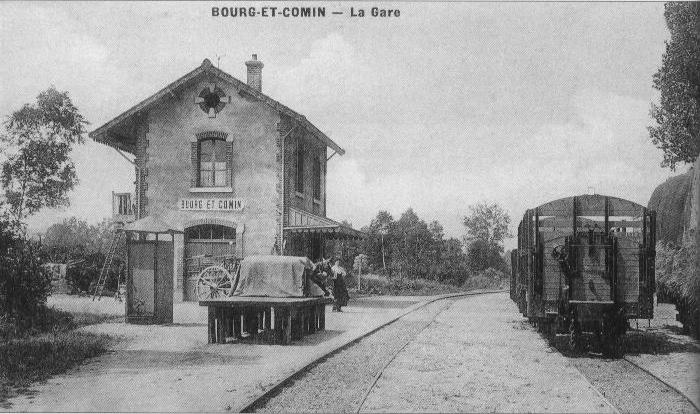
Bourg-et-Comin railway station c 1900.

== See also ==
- Communes of the Aisne department
