= Oise Lateral Canal =

Canal in northern France

Canal latéral à l'Oise
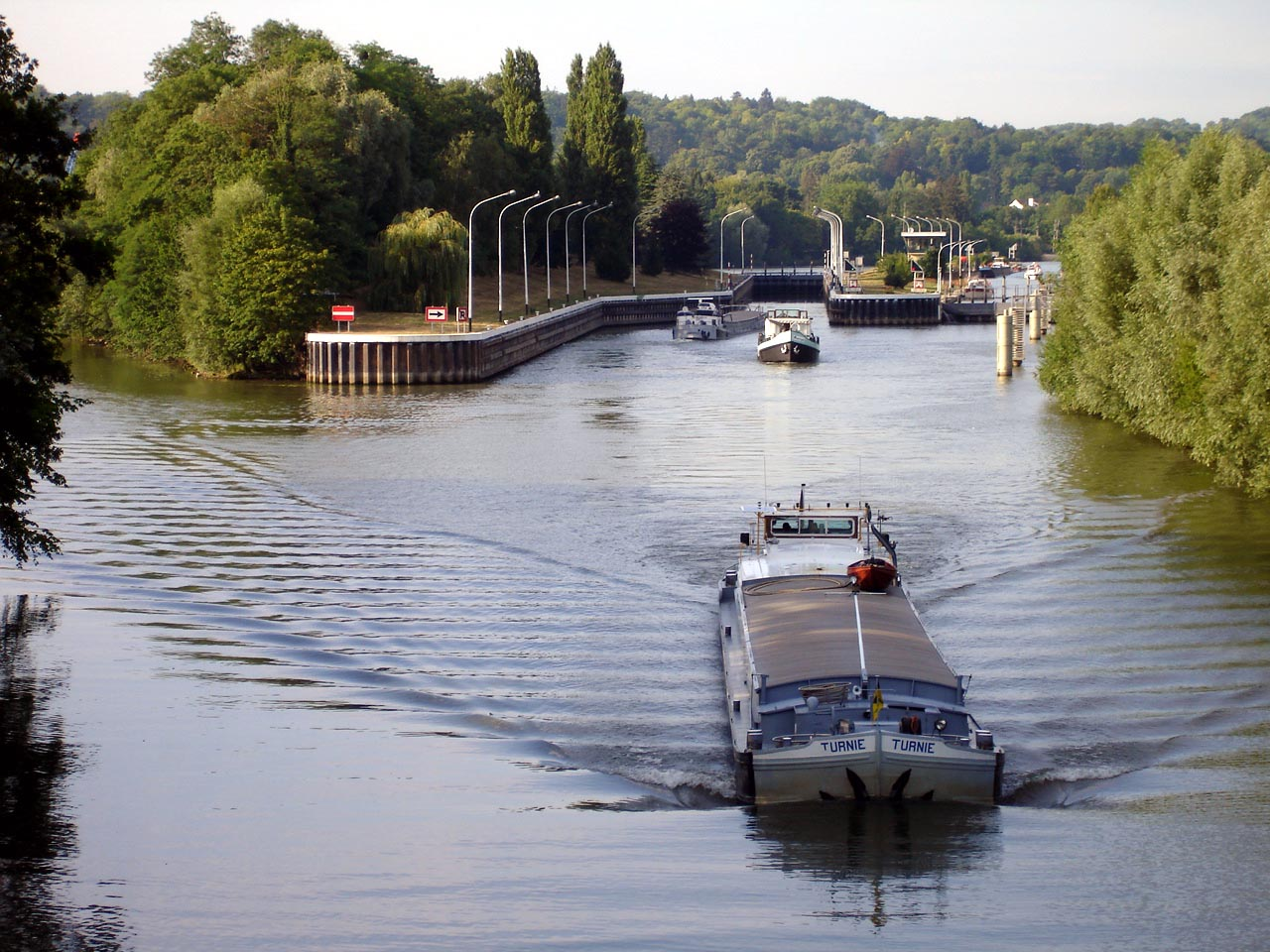
- Lock on the Oise at L'Isle-Adam, Val-d'Oise, France

Specifications
- Length: 34 km (21 mi)
- Lock length: 39 m (128 ft)
- Lock width: 6.50 m (21.3 ft)
- Locks: 4
- Status: Open

History
- Date completed: 1831

Geography
- Start point: Canal de Saint-Quentin at Chauny
- End point: Oise at Janville
- Beginning coordinates: 49.60417°N 3.22033°E
- Ending coordinates: 49.45750°N 3.85933°E
- Connects to: Canal de Saint-Quentin, Canal du Nord, River Oise

The Canal latéral à l'Oise (French pronunciation: [kanal lateʁal a lwaz]) is a canal in northern France that, along with the river Oise, connects the Canal de Saint-Quentin at Chauny to the Seine at Conflans-Sainte-Honorine. See under the river Oise for the continuation of the route; the junction is made downstream of the lock at Janville 49.45750°N 2.85933°E. When a canal is latéral (literally 'running beside'), it follows the course of the river it is named after but in a separate excavated channel. The route described below is the 34 km of canal parallel to the river Oise and 103.5 km of the canalised river Oise.

== History ==
The canal latéral was built in 1831 to provide a reliable navigation between Chauny and Janville, bypassing the winding course of the river Oise. Initially built to smaller dimensions, the locks were later doubled and enlarged to the Freycinet standard. With the opening of the Canal du Nord in 1965, it was decided to further improve the canal downstream of the junction with this new canal. The canal was made wider and deeper, and two new locks 100 by 12 m were built around 1970.

== Development ==
The 16-km length of the canal from Pont-l'Évêque to Janville (along with the river Oise beyond Janville to the confluence with the river Aisne) is projected to be replaced by the future high-capacity Seine–Nord Europe Canal.

== En route ==
The PK numbers below go from 0 to 34 at Janville and then decrease from 103.5 to 0 at the Seine.

- PK 0 Chauny junction with the Canal de Saint-Quentin
- PK 3 Junction with the canalised river Aisne (heading east towards Abbécourt and Reims)
- PK 18 Pont l'Eveque
- PK 18.5 Junction (right bank) with the Canal du Nord
- PK 33 Longueil-Annel
- PK 34 Lock #4, double, at Janville, route continues to the river Seine as canalised river Oise (103.5 km)

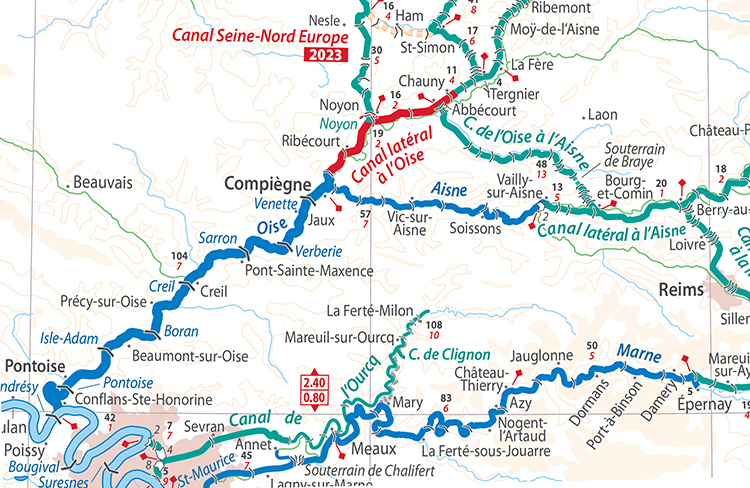
Location of the Canal lateral à l'Oise in relation to the canalised river Oise and the other canals towards northern France, the Meuse, the Aisne and the Marne, from the European Waterways Map and Directory, 5th edition (Transmanche)

== See also ==
- List of canals in France
