= Canal du Nord =

Canal in northern France

Coordinates: 50°17′N 3°07′E

- The Canal du Nord near Oisy-le-Verger
- Interactive map of Canal du Nord

Specifications
- Length: 95 km (59 mi)
- Lock length: 91.9 m (302 ft)
- Lock width: 6 m (20 ft)
- Locks: 19
- Status: Open
- Tunnels: Ruyaulcourt tunnel, Panneterie tunnel

History
- Principal engineer: Gabarit Freycinet
- Construction began: 1908
- Date completed: 1965

Geography
- Start point: Canal latéral à l'Oise, Pont-l'Évêque, France
- End point: Sensée Canal, Arleux, France

The Canal du Nord (French pronunciation: [kanal dy nɔʁ], literally Canal of the North) is a 95-kilometre (59 mi) long canal in northern France. The canal connects the Canal latéral à l'Oise in Pont-l'Évêque to the Sensée Canal in Arleux. The French government, in partnership with coal-mining companies in the Nord and Pas-de-Calais departments, developed the canal to help French coal mining companies withstand foreign competition. Construction of the canal began in 1908 but halted in 1914, because of the First World War. The war caused widespread destruction of the canal and the French government made no attempt to resume construction until 1959. Construction recommenced in 1960 and the waterway opened to the public in 1965. The Canal du Nord and the Canal de Saint-Quentin may be supplanted by the Seine–Nord Europe Canal, a projected high capacity link between the Oise River at Janville and the high capacity Dunkirk-Escaut Canal.

== History ==
Until the construction of the Canal du Nord, the Canal de Saint-Quentin was the only waterway linking the Seine basin to the north of France. The rise of the coal industry in Pas-de-Calais eventually saturated traffic on the Canal de Saint-Quentin and necessitated a new transportation link to the Île-de-France region to ensure that the northern French coal mining companies could effectively compete against their Belgian and English equivalents. In 1860, the principal coal companies in the Pas-de-Calais département grouped themselves into a Comité des Houillères du Pas-de-Calais, responsible for coping with transportation problems. The group expanded into the Comité des Houillères du Nord et du Pas-de-Calais in 1878, and began taking steps towards obtaining fundamental improvements in water connections.

A special commission of the French Ministry of Public Works conducted their first study in 1878 to find a “suitable means of putting the coal mines in a position to withstand foreign competition". The concept of the canal was included in the Freycinet Plan, a public works project whereby the government purchased railroads and built extensive new railways and waterways. Plans for the canal were presented to the Chamber of Deputies in 1882.

On 23 December 1903, the French government authorized construction of the Canal du Nord, a 93-kilometre long canal from Arleux to Pont-l'Évêque. The Canal du Nord would accommodate barges up to 300 tonnes and because it both increased waterway capacity and decreased transport distance, it was expected to decrease freight costs by up to 30%.

In 1908 construction began on the canal. Under the plan, coal-mining companies contributed one-third of the construction cost and by 1914 this amounted to 23 million francs of the total 72 million francs in incurred expenses. Three quarters of the excavations, 11 locks and all of the bridges were complete, with work well advanced on the tunnels, when World War I forced a halt in construction. The war resulted in widespread destruction of the canal and the French government did not attempt to resume building until much after World War II, when the rapid economic growth experienced by France in the 1950s saw a marked increase in bulk transport requirements between the Seine basin and the north, and it again became urgent to complete the project. The works were carried out in the early 1960s and the canal opened to navigation in 1966.

=== Future ===
The canal is expected to be abandoned and possibly even infilled in sections, when the projected parallel Seine-Nord Europe Canal has been built, as currently planned over the years 2018–2024.

== Battle of Canal du Nord ==
The Battle of the Canal du Nord was part of a general Allied offensive against German positions on the Western Front during the Hundred Days Offensive of World War I. The battle took place along an incomplete portion of the Canal du Nord and on the outskirts of Cambrai between 27 September and 1 October 1918. To avoid the risk of having extensive German reserves massed against a single Allied attack, the assault along the Canal du Nord was undertaken as part of a number of closely sequenced Allied attacks at separate points along the front. It began one day after the Meuse-Argonne Offensive, one day before an offensive in the Flanders region of Belgium, and two days before the Battle of St. Quentin Canal.

== En Route ==
- PK 0 Arleux
- PK 14 Mœuvres
- PK 48 Péronne, connection with Grande Somme
- PK 60 Épénancourt
- PK 66 Voyennes, connection with Petite Somme
- PK 92 Noyon
- PK 95 Pont-l'Évêque

== See also ==
- Canal de l'Est
- List of canals in France
