= Aisne Lateral Canal =

Canal in northern France

Canal latéral à l'Aisne
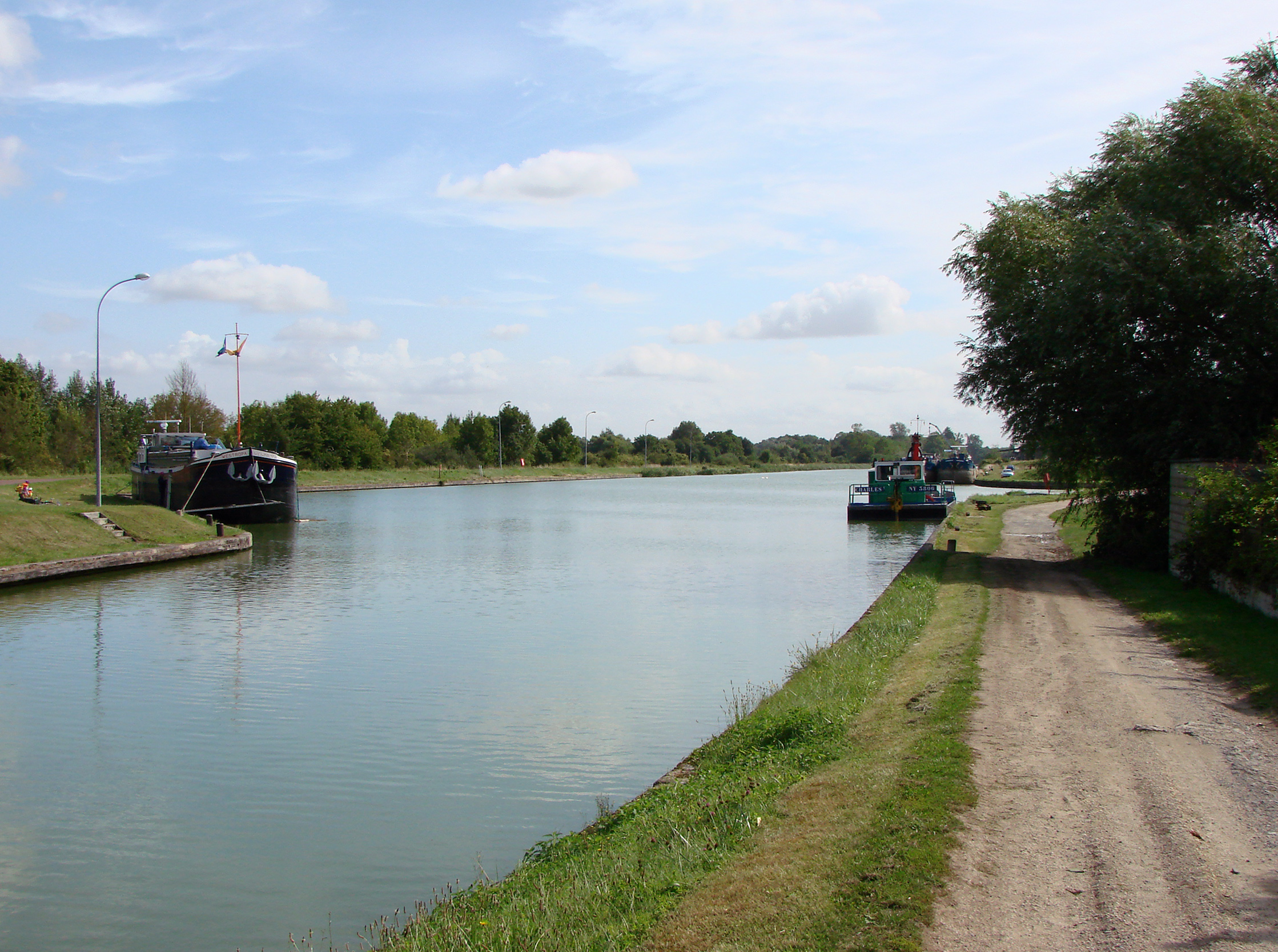
- Canal basin at Berry-au-Bac junction

Specifications
- Length: 51.3 km (31.9 mi)
- Lock length: 46 m (151 ft)
- Lock width: 7.95 m (26.1 ft)
- Minimum boat draft: 1.80m
- Minimum boat air draft: 3.50m
- Locks: 8
- Status: Open

History
- Date approved: 1834
- Date completed: 1841

Geography
- Start point: Vieux-lès-Asfeld
- End point: Condé-sur-Aisne
- Beginning coordinates: 49.44833°N 4.09527°E (easternmost point)
- Ending coordinates: 49.40128°N 3.48430°E (westernmost point)
- Connects to: Aisne, Canal des Ardennes

The Canal latéral à l'Aisne (French pronunciation: [kanal lateʁal a lɛn]) is a canal in northern France, which connects the Canal des Ardennes at Vieux-lès-Asfeld to the canalised river Aisne at Condé-sur-Aisne. It is 51.3 km (31.9 mi) long, with 8 locks. It runs alongside the Aisne. It has junctions with the Canal de l'Aisne à la Marne at Berry-au-Bac and with the Canal de l'Oise à l'Aisne in Bourg-et-Comin.

== En route ==
Kilometre distances are given from east to west, and are continued along the canalised river Aisne down to the junction with the river Oise at PK 108

- PK 0 Junction with Canal des Ardennes below the last lock of the latter, downstream from Vieux-lès-Asfeld
- PK 10.5 Variscourt
- PK 18.5 Berry-au-Bac junction, on the south side, with the Canal de l'Aisne à la Marne to Reims
- PK 38.5 Right junction with Canal de l'Oise à l'Aisne in Bourg-et-Comin
- PK 49 Vailly-sur-Aisne
- PK 51.5 at Celles-sur-Aisne. Navigation continues in the canalised Aisne to PK108 with 7 more locks [2]
