= Noyon station =

Railway station in Noyon, France

Coordinates: 49°34′37″N 3°0′23″E

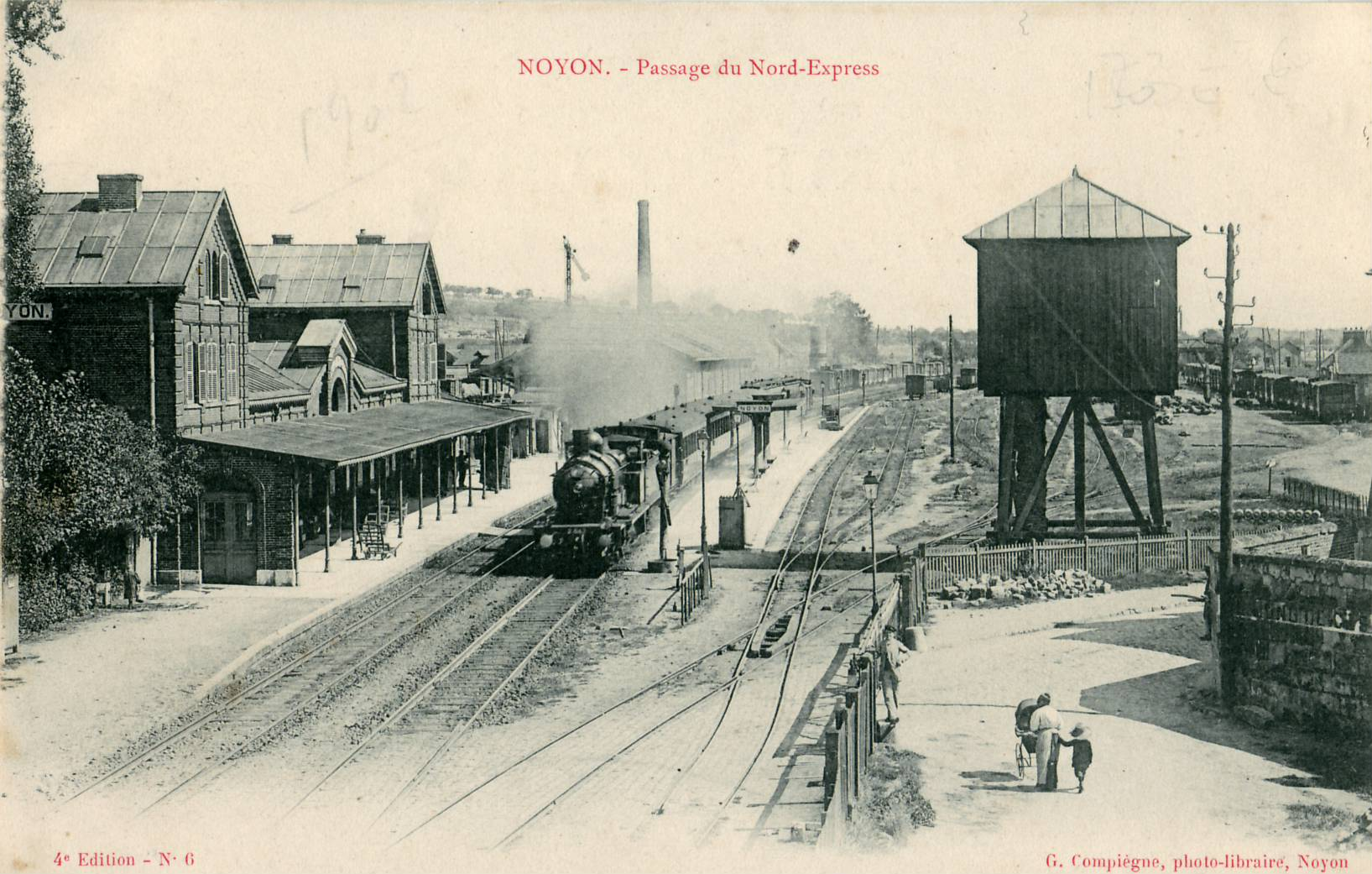
Noyon station

Noyon is a railway station serving the town Noyon, Oise department, northern France. It is situated on the Creil–Jeumont railway.

== Services ==
The station is served by regional trains to Creil, Saint-Quentin and Paris.

Preceding station	TER Hauts-de-France	Following station
Chauny towards Saint-Quentin	Krono K14	Compiègne towards Paris-Nord
Appilly towards Saint-Quentin	Proxi P14	Ourscamps towards Compiègne
