= Condé-sur-Aisne =

- Commune
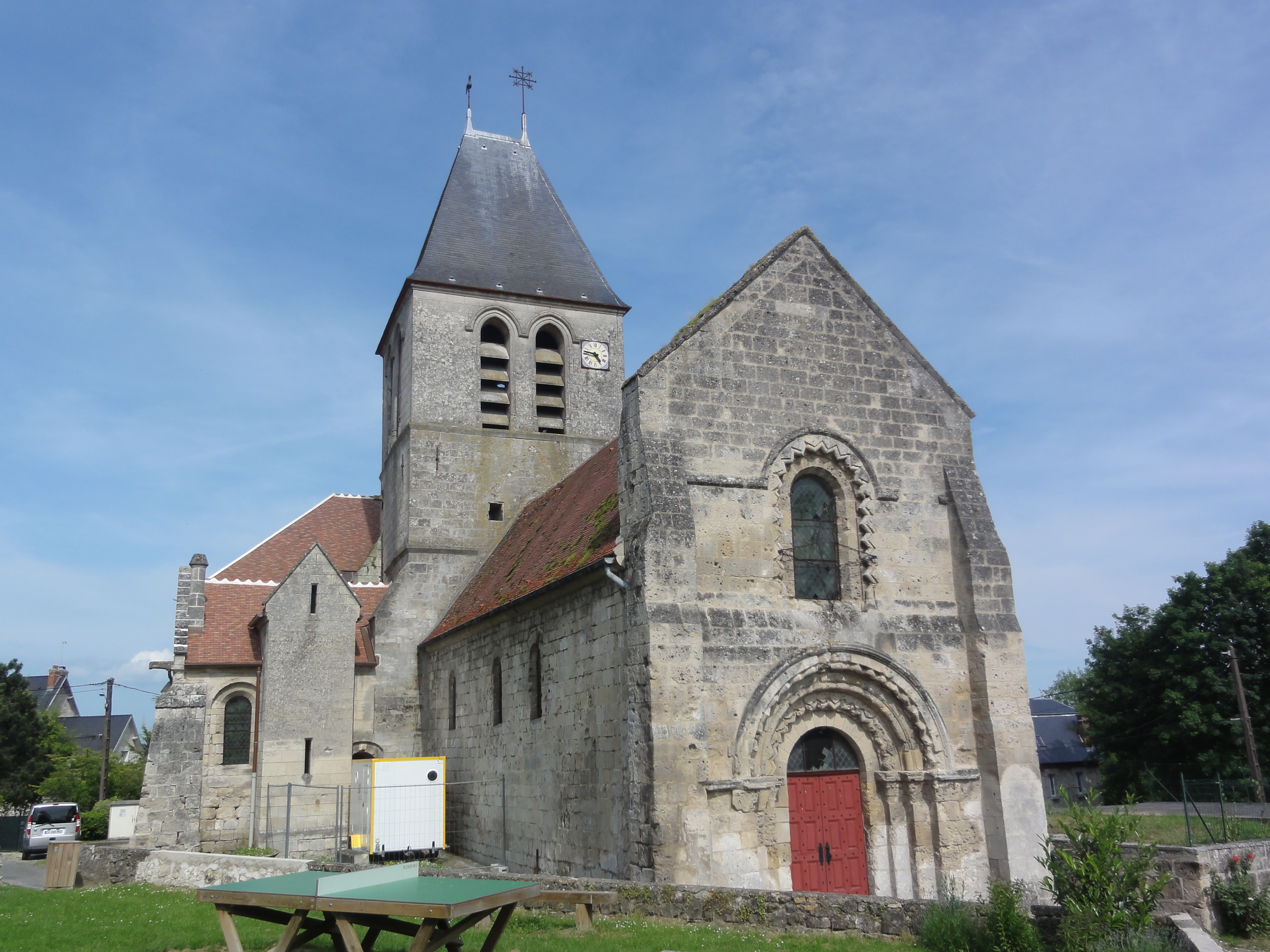
- The church of Condé-sur-Aisne
- Location of Condé-sur-Aisne
- Location within France Location within Hauts-de-France
- Coordinates: 49°23′56″N 3°28′11″E
- Country: France
- Region: Hauts-de-France
- Department: Aisne
- Arrondissement: Soissons
- Canton: Fère-en-Tardenois
- Intercommunality: Val de l'Aisne

Government
  - Mayor (2026–32): Typhaine Guédon
- Area^{1}: 3.73 km^{2} (1.44 sq mi)
- Elevation: 54 m (177 ft)
- Highest elevation: 171 m (561 ft)
- Lowest elevation: 42 m (138 ft)
- Population (2023): 352
  - Density: 94.4/km^{2} (244/sq mi)
- Time zone: UTC+01:00 (CET)
  - Summer (DST): UTC+02:00 (CEST)
- INSEE/Postal code: 02210 /02370
- ^{1} French Land Register data, which excludes lakes, ponds, glaciers > 1 km^{2} (0.386 sq mi or 247 acres) and river estuaries.

Condé-sur-Aisne (French pronunciation: [kɔ̃de syʁ ɛn]) is a commune in the Aisne department in Hauts-de-France in northern France.

== Population ==
Historical population
| Year | Pop. | ±% p.a. |
|---|---|---|
| 1968 | 174 | — |
| 1975 | 227 | +3.87% |
| 1982 | 245 | +1.10% |
| 1990 | 318 | +3.31% |
| 1999 | 358 | +1.33% |
| 2007 | 372 | +0.48% |
| 2012 | 402 | +1.56% |
| 2017 | 360 | −2.18% |
| 2023 | 352 | −0.37% |
Source: INSEE

== See also ==
- Communes of the Aisne department
