= Chauny station =

Railway station in Chauny, France

Coordinates: 49°36′40″N 3°13′25″E

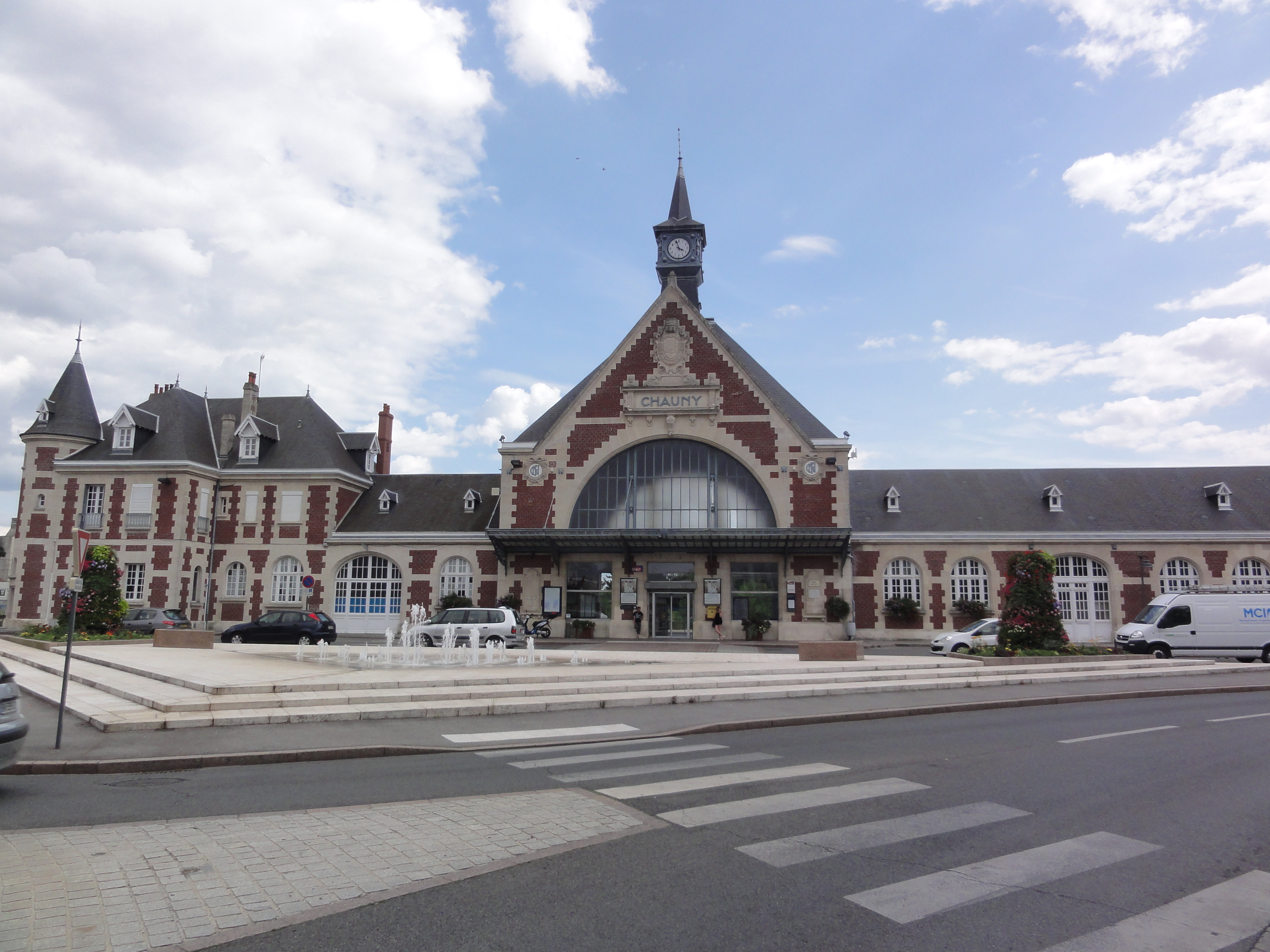
Chauny station

Chauny station (French: Gare de Chauny) is a railway station serving the town Chauny, Aisne department, northern France. It is situated on the Creil–Jeumont railway.

== Services ==
The station is served by regional trains to Compiègne, Saint-Quentin and Paris.

Preceding station	TER Hauts-de-France	Following station
Tergnier towards Saint-Quentin	Krono K14	Noyon towards Paris-Nord
Viry-Noureuil towards Saint-Quentin	Proxi P14	Appilly towards Compiègne

== See also ==
- List of SNCF stations in Hauts-de-France
