= Berry-au-Bac =

- Commune
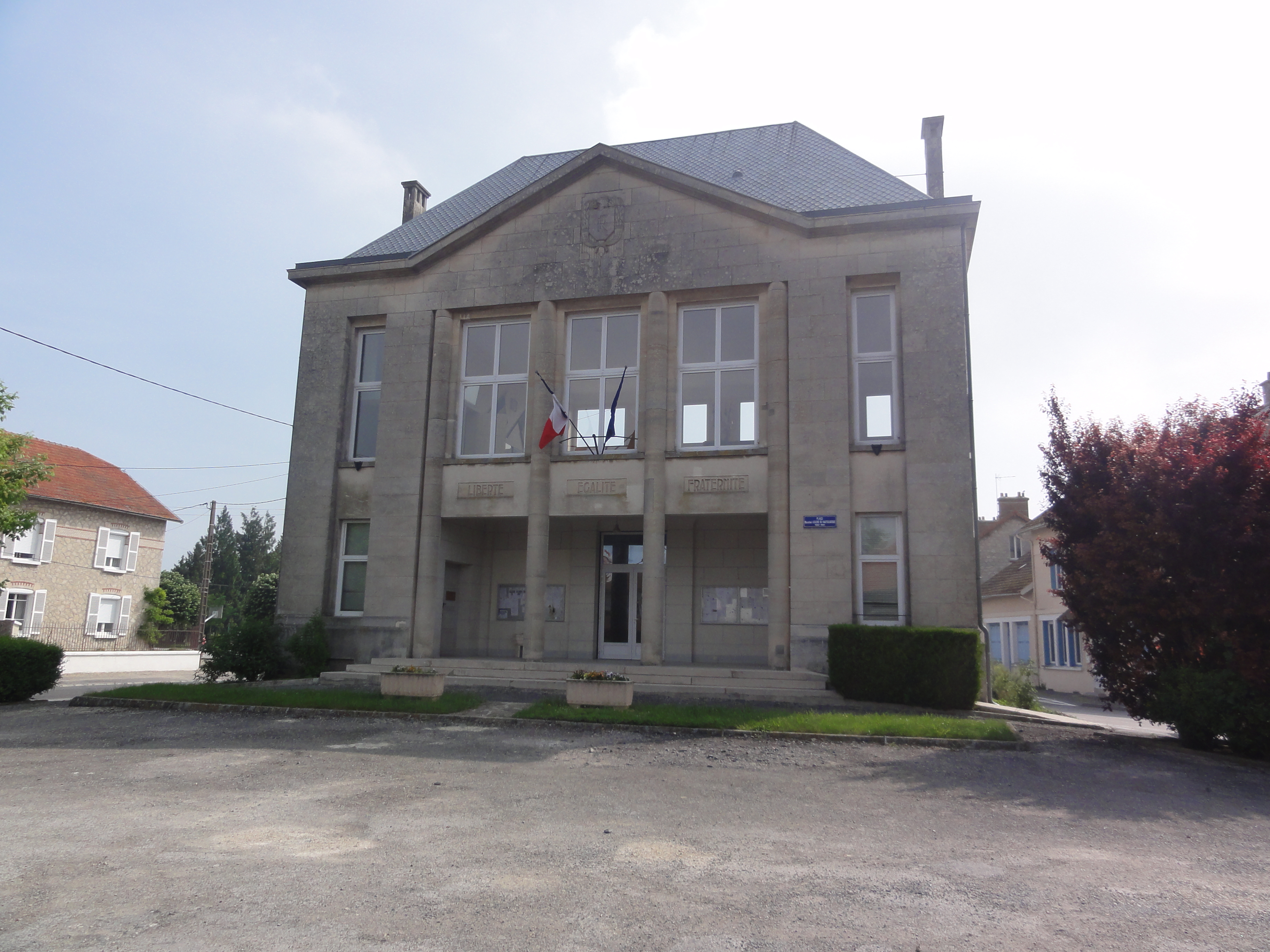
- Town hall

- Coat of arms
- Location of Berry-au-Bac
- Location within France Location within Hauts-de-France
- Coordinates: 49°24′16″N 3°54′08″E
- Country: France
- Region: Hauts-de-France
- Department: Aisne
- Arrondissement: Laon
- Canton: Villeneuve-sur-Aisne
- Intercommunality: Champagne Picarde

Government
  - Mayor (2026–32): Didier Pinchon
- Area^{1}: 8.1 km^{2} (3.1 sq mi)
- Elevation: 62 m (203 ft)
- Highest elevation: 91 m (299 ft)
- Lowest elevation: 50 m (160 ft)
- Population (2023): 722
  - Density: 89/km^{2} (230/sq mi)
- Time zone: UTC+01:00 (CET)
  - Summer (DST): UTC+02:00 (CEST)
- INSEE/Postal code: 02073 /02190
- ^{1} French Land Register data, which excludes lakes, ponds, glaciers > 1 km^{2} (0.386 sq mi or 247 acres) and river estuaries.

Berry-au-Bac (French pronunciation: [beʁi o bak]) is a commune in the department of Aisne in Hauts-de-France in northern France.

== Population ==
Historical population
Year	Pop.	±% p.a.
1968	350	—
1975	334	−0.67%
1982	388	+2.16%
1990	509	+3.45%
1999	528	+0.41%
2007	548	+0.47%
2012	591	+1.52%
2017	653	+2.02%
2023	722	+1.69%
Source: INSEE

== See also ==
- Communes of the Aisne department
