= Oise-Aisne Canal =

Canal in northern France

Canal de l'Oise à l'Aisne
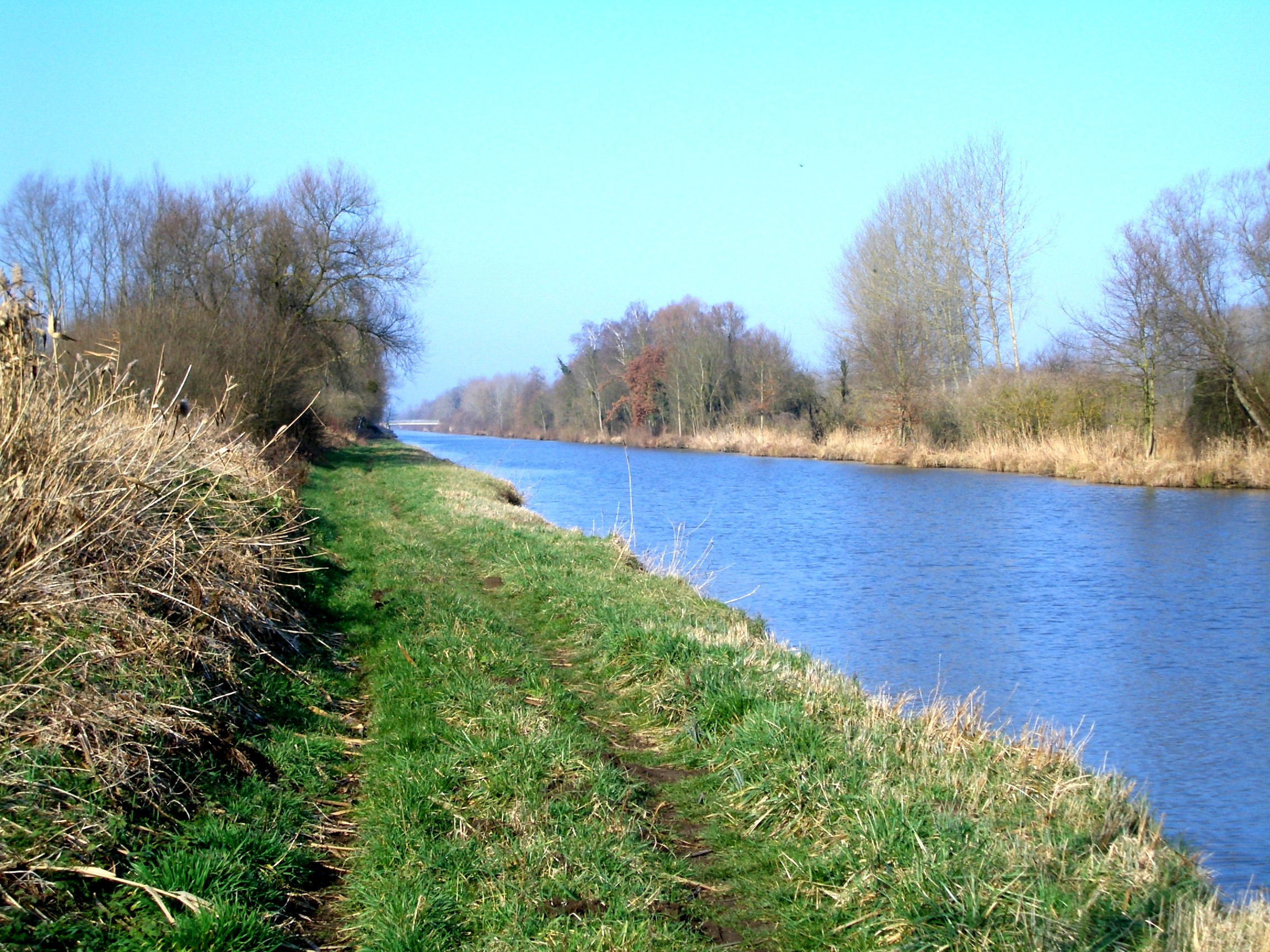
- The Canal de l'Oise à l'Aisne at Guny (PK 11)

Specifications
- Length: 48 km (30 mi)
- Locks: 13

History
- Date completed: 1890

Geography
- Start point: Abbécourt
- End point: Bourg-et-Comin
- Beginning coordinates: 49.59195°N 3.19054°E
- Ending coordinates: 49.38873°N 3.65561°E
- Connects to: Canal latéral à l'Aisne at Abbécourt; Canal latéral à l'Oise at Bourg-et-Comin

The Canal de l'Oise à l'Aisne (French pronunciation: [kanal də lwaz a lɛn], literally Canal of the Oise to the Aisne) is a summit level canal in the Hauts-de-France region (northern France), formerly Picardy. It connects the Canal latéral à l'Aisne at Abbécourt to the Canal latéral à l'Oise at Bourg-et-Comin.

== En route ==
- PK 0 Junction with Canal latéral à l'Aisne at Abbécourt
- PK 25.5 Pinon
- PK 35 Pargny-Filain
- Summit level reservoir, Bassin de Monampteuil
- PK 38-40.5 Braye-en-Laonnois tunnel (2365m) 49.45619°N 3.58789°E to 49.43816°N 3.60481°E
- PK 48 Junction with Canal latéral à l'Oise at Bourg-et-Comin

== See also ==
- List of canals in France
