= Pont-l'Évêque, Oise =

Pont-l'Évêque
- Commune
- Coat of arms
- Location of Pont-l'Évêque
- Location within France Location within Hauts-de-France
- Coordinates: 49°33′55″N 2°59′19″E
- Country: France
- Region: Hauts-de-France
- Department: Oise
- Arrondissement: Compiègne
- Canton: Noyon
- Intercommunality: Pays Noyonnais

Government
  - Mayor (2021–2026): Martine Ponthieux
- Area^{1}: 1.13 km^{2} (0.44 sq mi)
- Elevation: 37 m (121 ft)
- Highest elevation: 44 m (144 ft)
- Lowest elevation: 36 m (118 ft)
- Population (2023): 648
  - Density: 573/km^{2} (1,490/sq mi)
- Time zone: UTC+01:00 (CET)
  - Summer (DST): UTC+02:00 (CEST)
- INSEE/Postal code: 60506 /60400
- ^{1} French Land Register data, which excludes lakes, ponds, glaciers > 1 km^{2} (0.386 sq mi or 247 acres) and river estuaries.

Pont-l'Évêque (French pronunciation: [pɔ̃ levɛːk]) is a commune in the Oise department in northern France.

== Population ==
Historical population
Year	Pop.	±% p.a.
1968	656	—
1975	663	+0.15%
1982	596	−1.51%
1990	659	+1.26%
1999	803	+2.22%
2007	731	−1.17%
2012	697	−0.95%
2017	672	−0.73%
2023	648	−0.60%
Source: INSEE

== See also ==
- Communes of the Oise department
