= Chauny =

- Commune
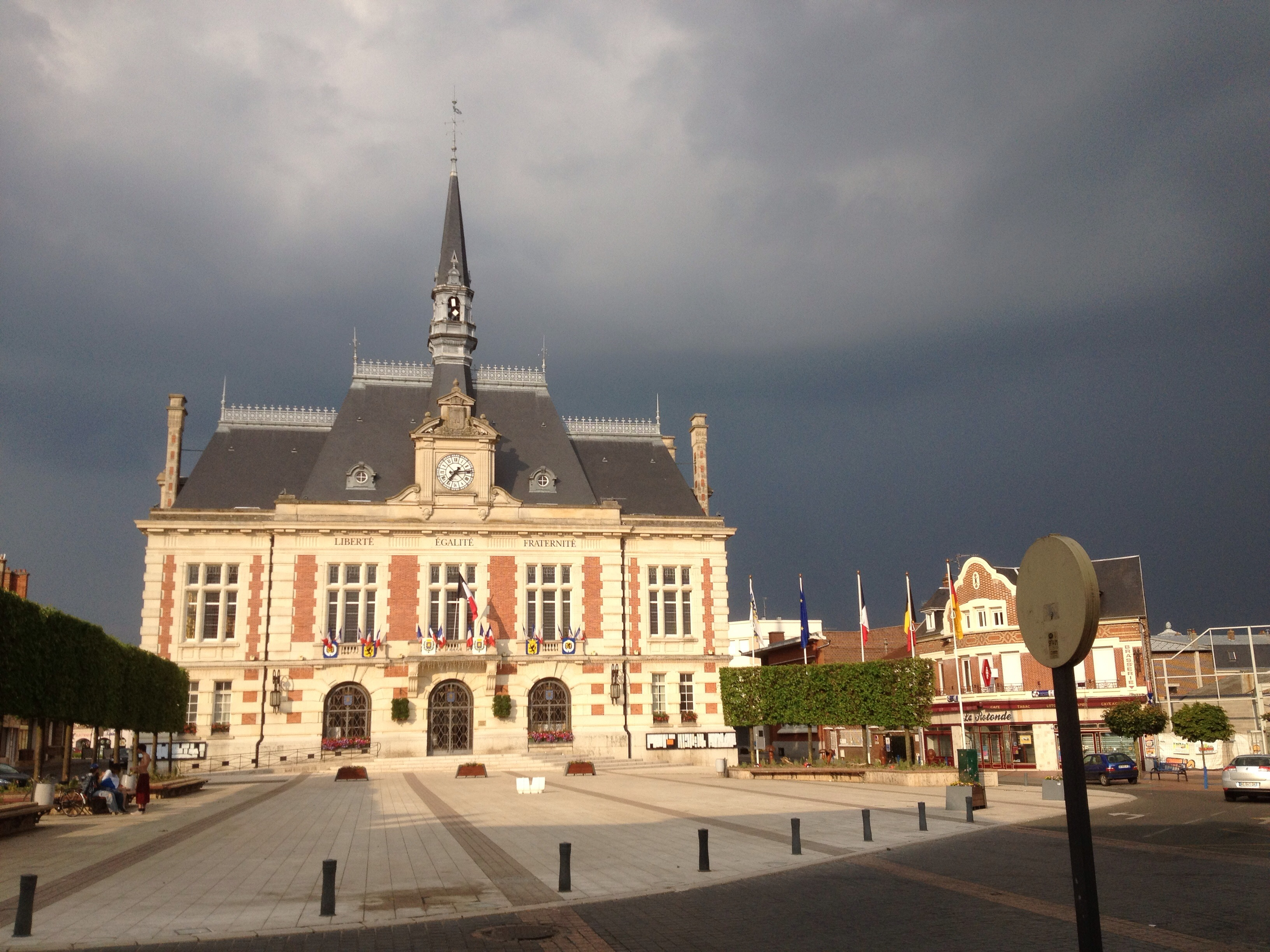
- Town hall

- Coat of arms
- Location of Chauny
- Location within France Location within Hauts-de-France
- Coordinates: 49°36′59″N 3°13′12″E
- Country: France
- Region: Hauts-de-France
- Department: Aisne
- Arrondissement: Laon
- Canton: Chauny
- Intercommunality: CA Chauny Tergnier La Fère

Government
  - Mayor (2026–32): David Telatynski
- Area^{1}: 13.28 km^{2} (5.13 sq mi)
- Elevation: 69 m (226 ft)
- Highest elevation: 96 m (315 ft)
- Lowest elevation: 42 m (138 ft)
- Population (2023): 11,596
  - Density: 873.2/km^{2} (2,262/sq mi)
- Time zone: UTC+01:00 (CET)
  - Summer (DST): UTC+02:00 (CEST)
- INSEE/Postal code: 02173 /02300
- ^{1} French Land Register data, which excludes lakes, ponds, glaciers > 1 km^{2} (0.386 sq mi or 247 acres) and river estuaries.

Chauny (French pronunciation: [ʃoni]) is a commune in the Aisne department in Hauts-de-France in northern France.

== History ==
There has been a settlement on the site, more or less continuously, since at least the Carolingian era. Known variously as Calgny, Cauny, Canni, Calni or as Chaulni. In Latin, contemporary chroniclers and historians such as Flodoard, Guibert de Noyon/Nogent used at least 13 different names when referring to it; such as Calnacum, Calniacum, Cauniacum, Calviniacum and Channiacum.

Chauny, then a mere castle, served as a refuge for those fleeing the Vandal and Hunnic invasions of 407 and 451 respectively.

The town was occupied by German forces for part of World War I, and was close to the front lines for much of the war. It was extensively destroyed during the process of its recapture by Allied forces in 1917. It is disputed whether, or to what degree, the destruction was caused by Allied bombardments, aerial and artillery, versus demolition by retreating Germans.

The community was rebuilt after that war, largely in a traditional French "châteaux" style; in particular the municipal buildings, done in red brick with stonework. Most of the existing structures date from this time, or later; especially those in the town centre.

During World War II, a chemical factory in the town was bombed by Allied aircraft, on 8 August 1944. This was completed as part of an attack on industrial infrastructure. The town was liberated by American forces on 2 September 1944.

== Geography ==
Built on the banks of the Oise and the Saint-Quentin canal, the town still retains its port to this day. Chauny is roughly equal distances from Soissons (34 km), Laon (36 km) and Saint-Quentin, Aisne (30 km) and is right at the heart of Picardy.

Chauny is well linked to the rest of the region by road : close to the A26 and A29 motorways which head towards Saint Quentin. The national airports in Paris are an hour by car.

The town is served by an important railway network and the railway line has passed through the town since 1849. The railway station in Chauny is part of the Paris - St Quentin - Maubeuge line, and is well serviced by Corail and TER trains towards Paris, Compiègne and Saint Quentin. The station was re built after the war to plans by Urbain Cassan.

The Saint-Quentin canal was built as a junction between the Somme and the Oise in 1738, is popular with barges.

A very modern theatre often shows cultural exhibitions and performances. Close by are the forests of Saint-Gobain and Coucy Basse.

== Schools ==
The town today has three collèges and four lycées: there is a scientific, technical and professional lycée, Jean Macé, a general and technical lycée, Gay-Lussac, a private lycée, Saint-Charles, and a private agricultural lycée, Robert Schuman.

== Population ==
Historical population
Year	Pop.	±% p.a.
1968	13,920	—
1975	14,405	+0.49%
1982	13,435	−0.99%
1990	12,926	−0.48%
1999	12,523	−0.35%
2007	12,518	−0.00%
2012	11,832	−1.12%
2017	11,878	+0.08%
2023	11,596	−0.40%
Source: INSEE

== Twin towns – sister cities ==
Chauny is twinned with:

- Andenne, Belgium
- Bergheim, Germany

== Gallery ==
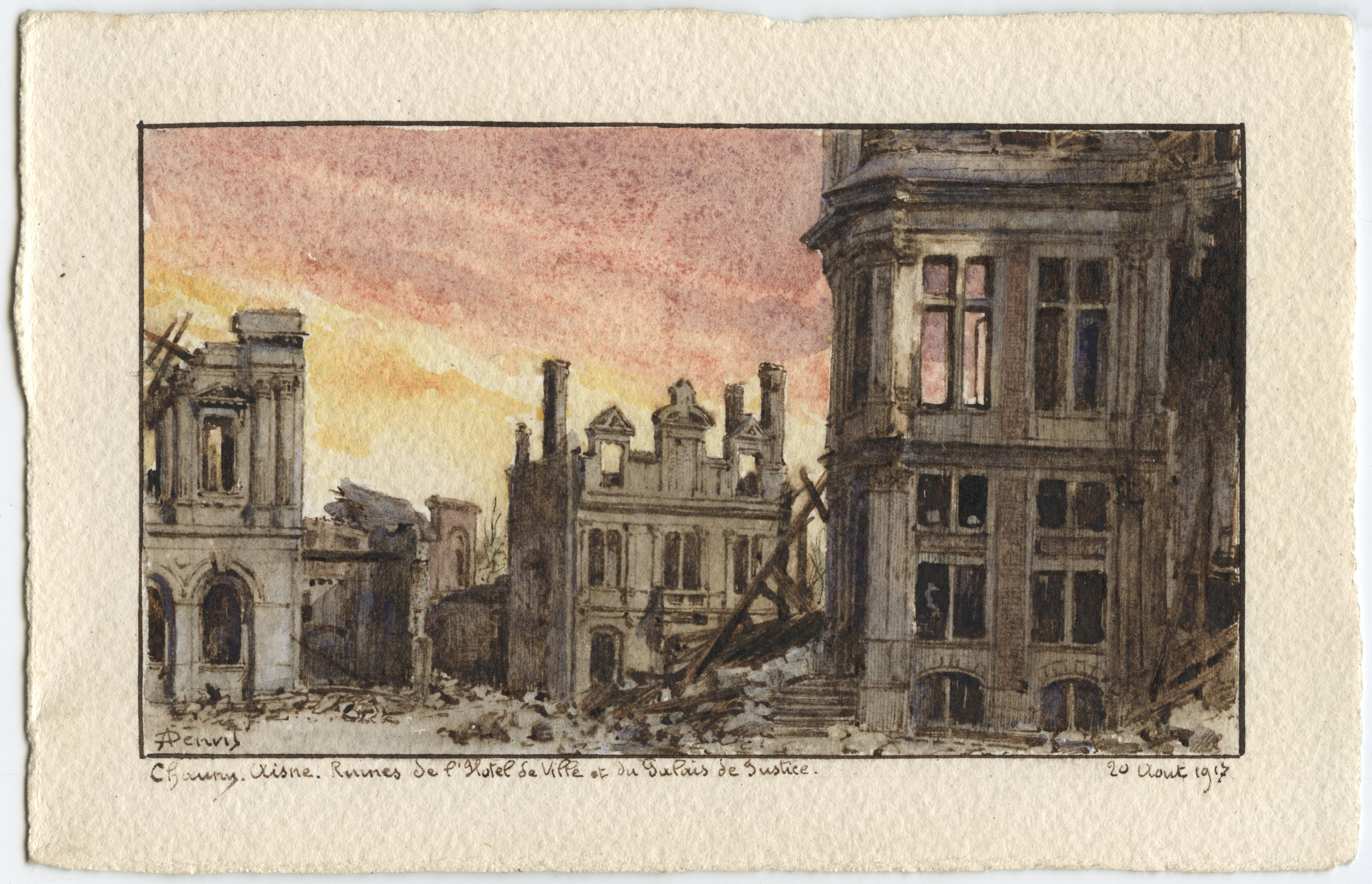
A view of the downtown in ruins on 20 August 1917 showing the destroyed Hôtel de Ville and Palais de Justice, among other core buildings; as shown on a war-charity art postcard painted by A. B. Denvil.

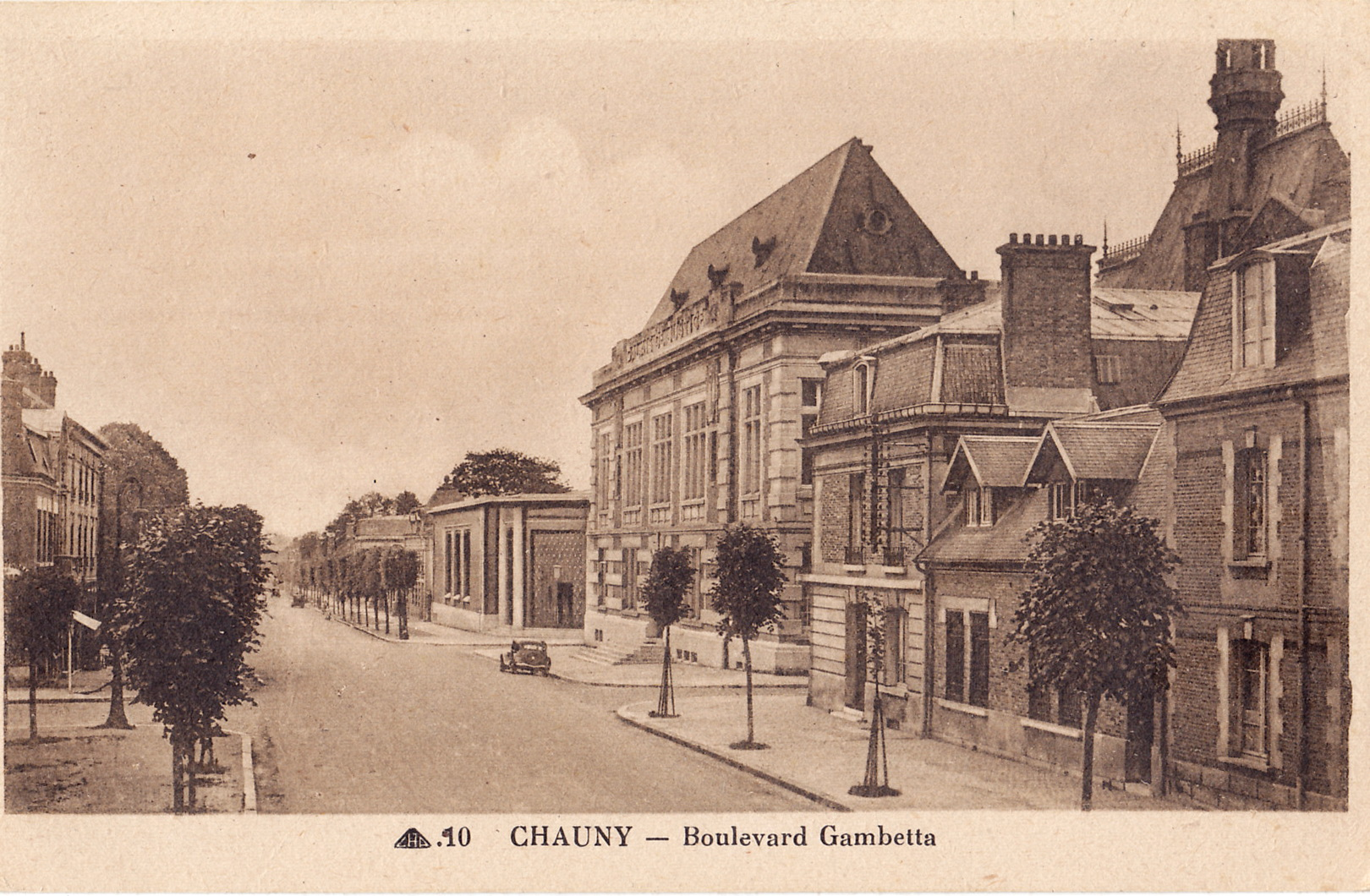
The rebuilt downtown including the new Palais de Justice, circa 1930s

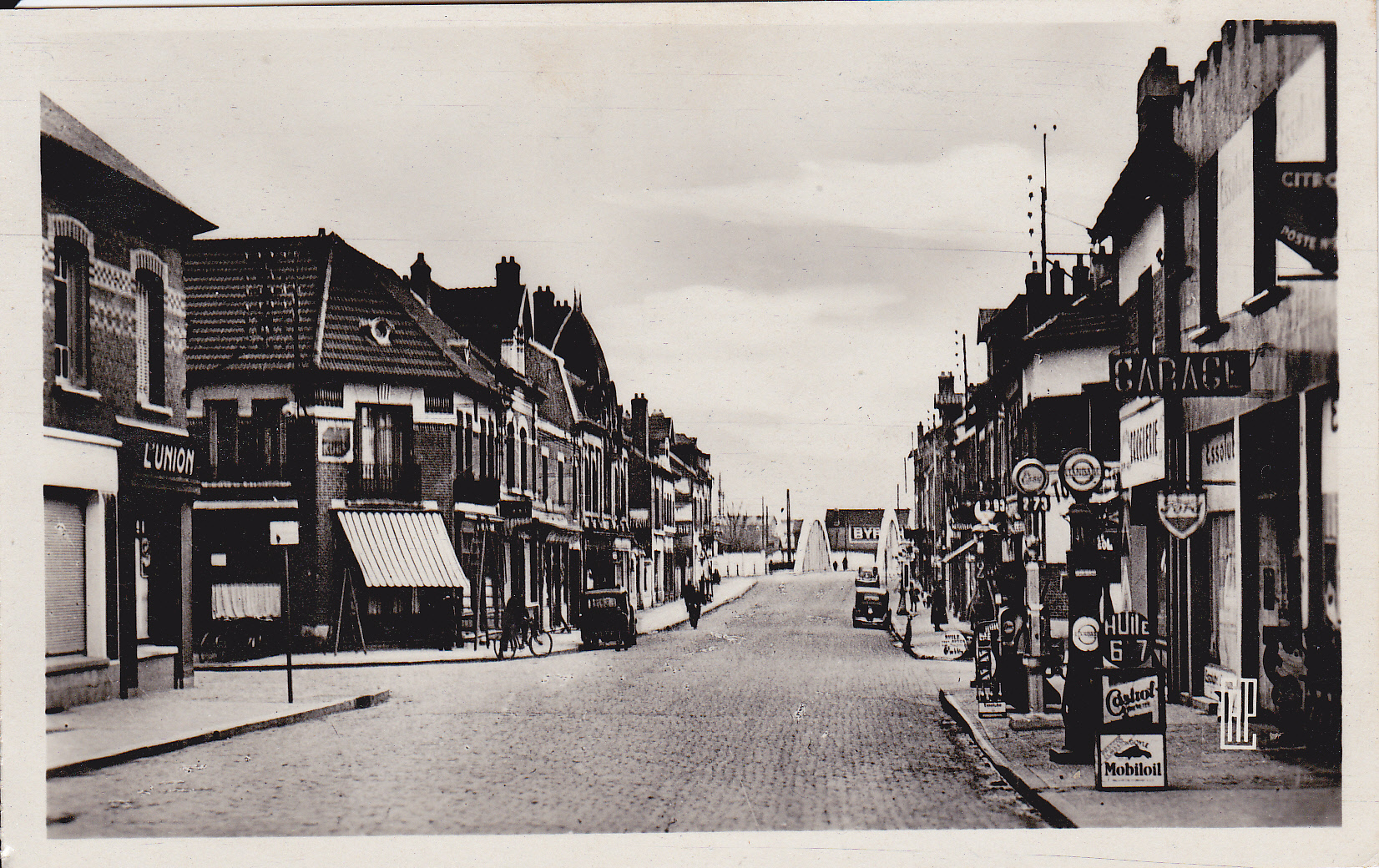
View of downtown in the 1930s

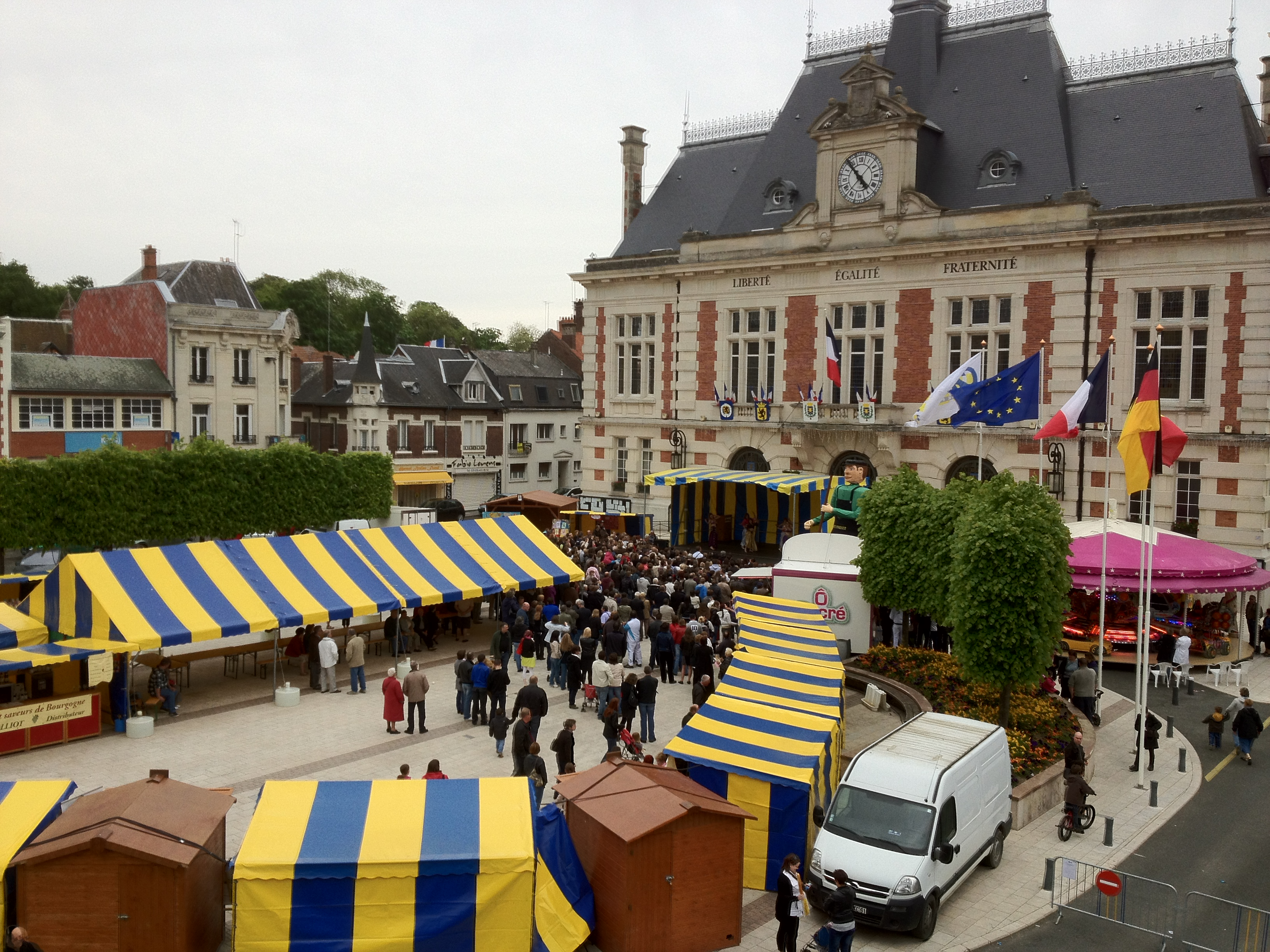
The town square during a festival, with the "new" Hôtel de Ville

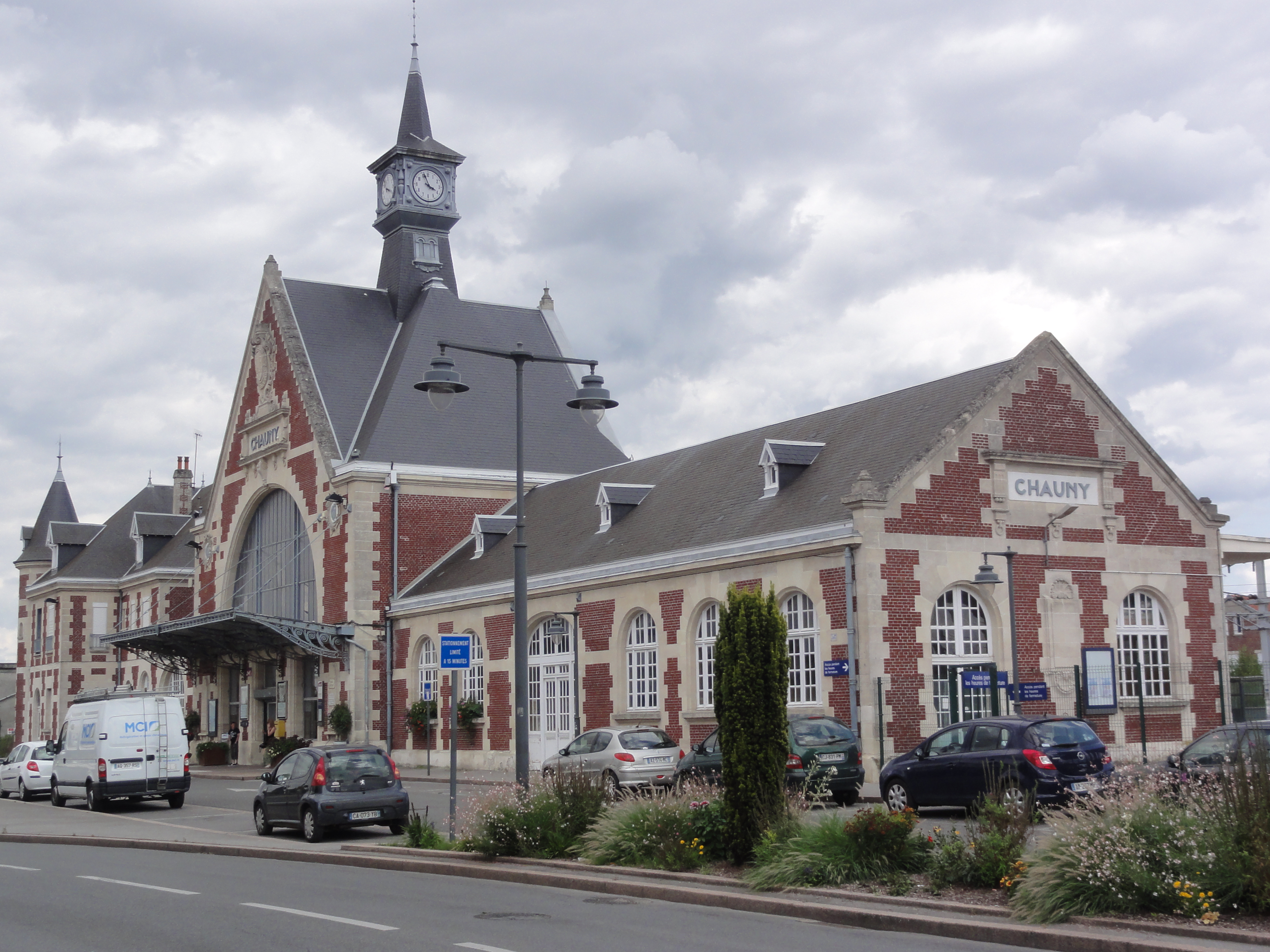
Train station

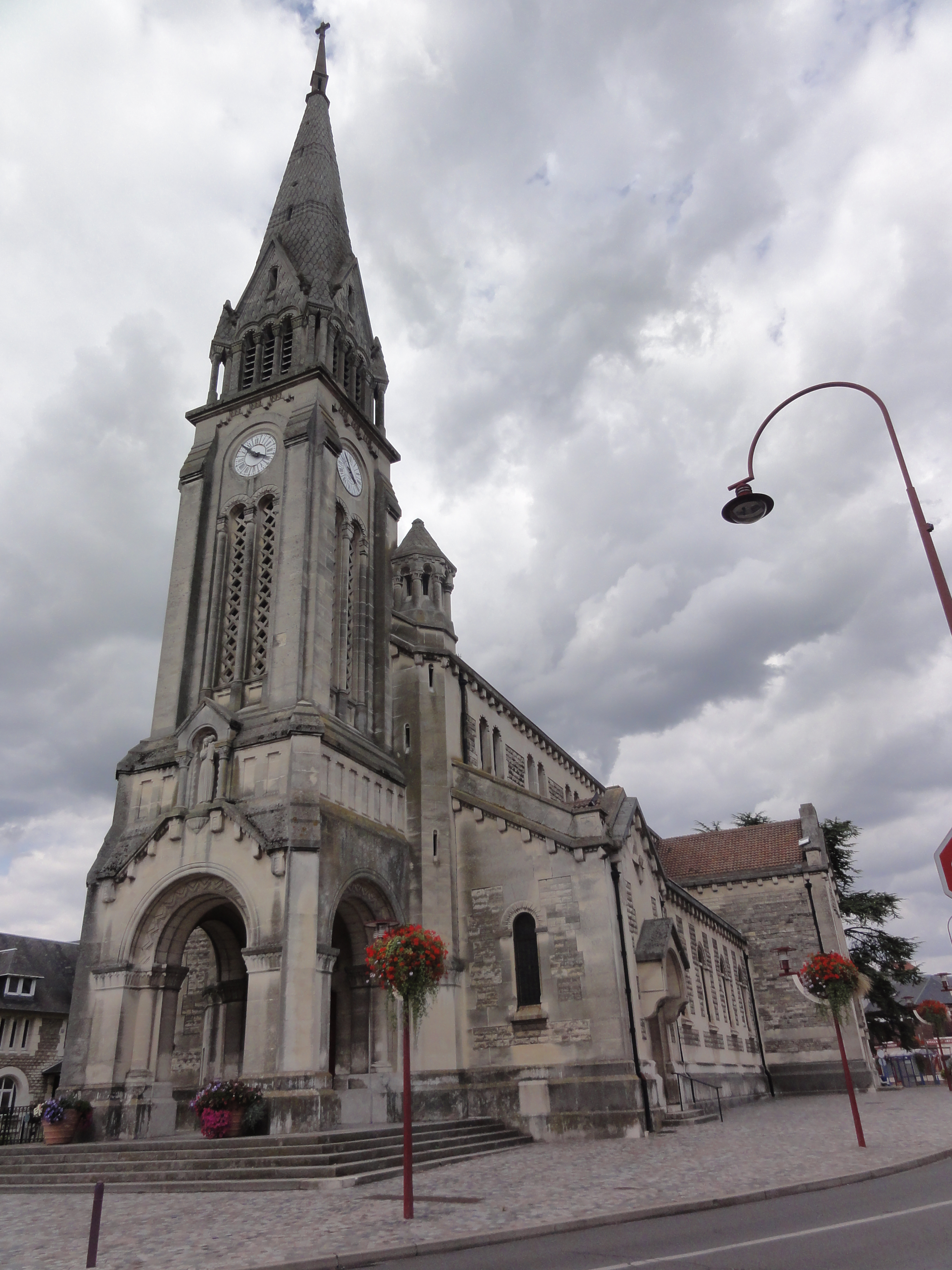
Église Notre-Dame de Chauny

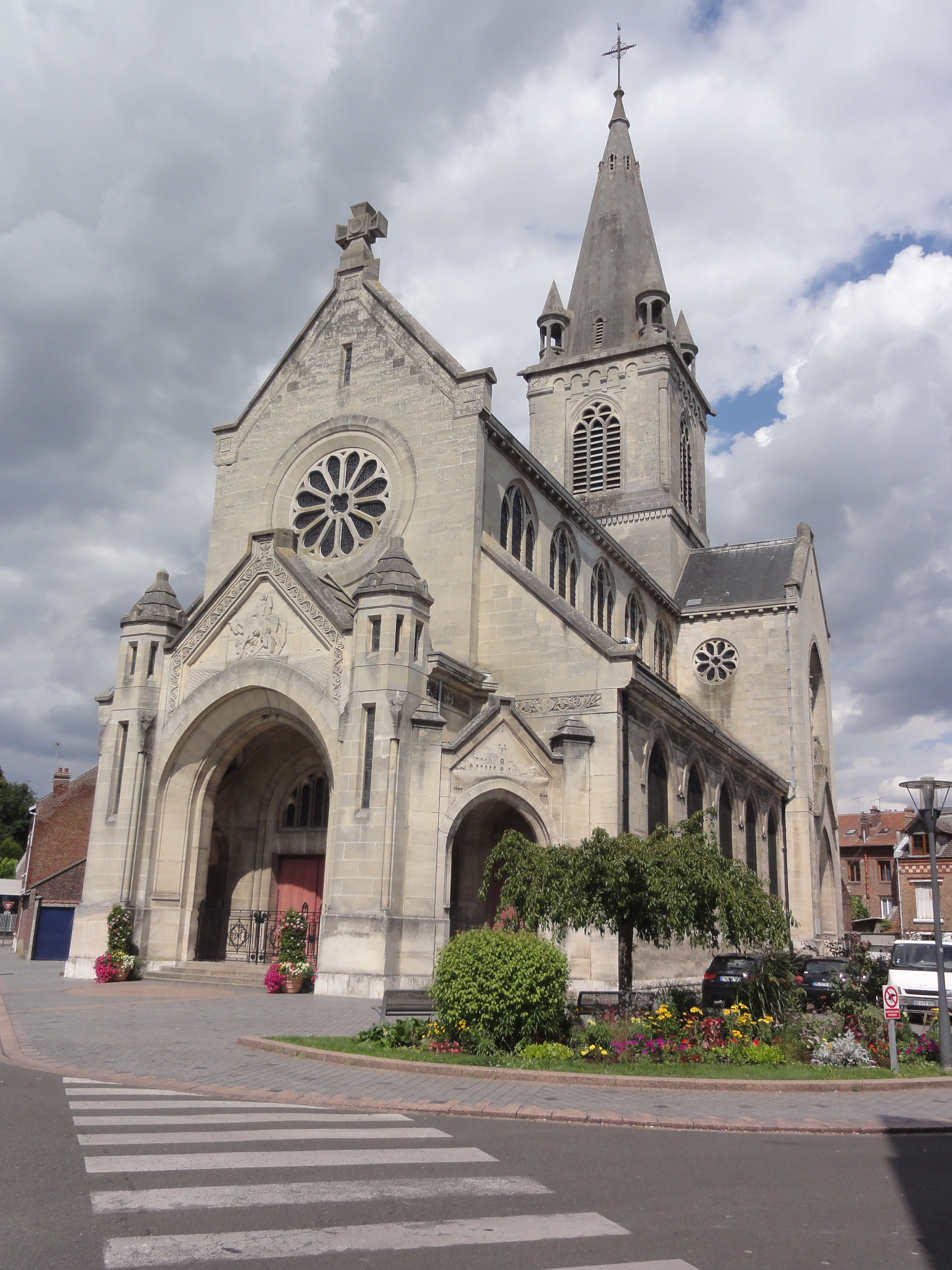
Église Saint-Martin de Chauny

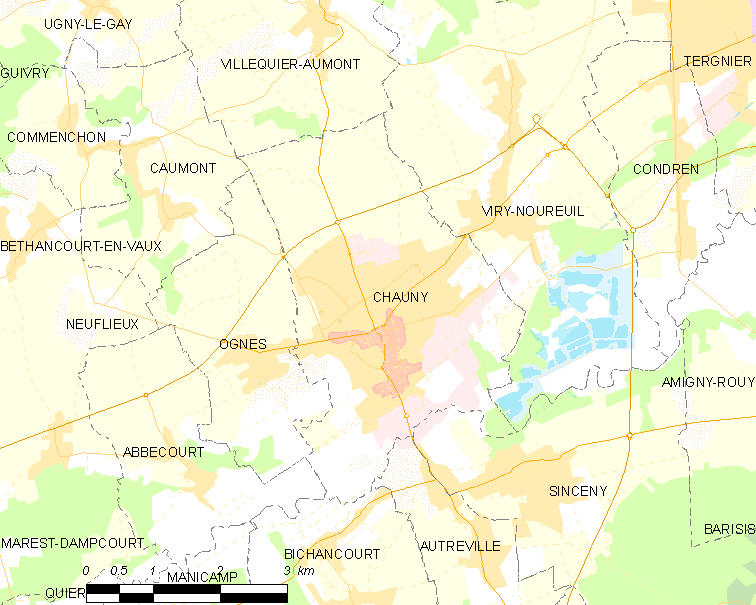
A basic map of Chauny and the surrounding area

== Climate ==
Climate data for Chauny (1991–2020 normals, extremes 1988–present)
Month	Jan	Feb	Mar	Apr	May	Jun	Jul	Aug	Sep	Oct	Nov	Dec	Year
Record high °C (°F)	15.3 (59.5)	19.3 (66.7)	25.0 (77.0)	27.6 (81.7)	31.1 (88.0)	35.1 (95.2)	41.5 (106.7)	38.6 (101.5)	34.4 (93.9)	27.7 (81.9)	20.1 (68.2)	17.0 (62.6)	41.5 (106.7)
Mean daily maximum °C (°F)	6.3 (43.3)	7.4 (45.3)	11.5 (52.7)	15.5 (59.9)	18.9 (66.0)	22.1 (71.8)	24.9 (76.8)	24.6 (76.3)	20.6 (69.1)	15.6 (60.1)	10.0 (50.0)	6.7 (44.1)	15.3 (59.5)
Daily mean °C (°F)	3.9 (39.0)	4.5 (40.1)	7.5 (45.5)	10.4 (50.7)	13.7 (56.7)	16.7 (62.1)	19.1 (66.4)	18.9 (66.0)	15.6 (60.1)	11.8 (53.2)	7.2 (45.0)	4.4 (39.9)	11.1 (52.0)
Mean daily minimum °C (°F)	1.5 (34.7)	1.6 (34.9)	3.4 (38.1)	5.2 (41.4)	8.5 (47.3)	11.3 (52.3)	13.4 (56.1)	13.3 (55.9)	10.6 (51.1)	8.0 (46.4)	4.5 (40.1)	2.1 (35.8)	7.0 (44.6)
Record low °C (°F)	−14.0 (6.8)	−13.0 (8.6)	−11.5 (11.3)	−3.6 (25.5)	−0.7 (30.7)	2.4 (36.3)	5.6 (42.1)	5.4 (41.7)	0.0 (32.0)	−4.0 (24.8)	−9.3 (15.3)	−11.7 (10.9)	−14.0 (6.8)
Average precipitation mm (inches)	56.6 (2.23)	54.3 (2.14)	55.2 (2.17)	44.2 (1.74)	61.7 (2.43)	60.1 (2.37)	60.6 (2.39)	68.6 (2.70)	51.6 (2.03)	63.9 (2.52)	58.3 (2.30)	74.8 (2.94)	709.9 (27.95)
Average precipitation days (≥ 1.0 mm)	11.1	10.5	10.4	9.1	9.6	8.7	9.2	9.5	9.2	10.7	10.6	12.8	121.4
Source: Meteociel

== See also ==
- Communes of the Aisne department
