= Aisne (river) =

River in France

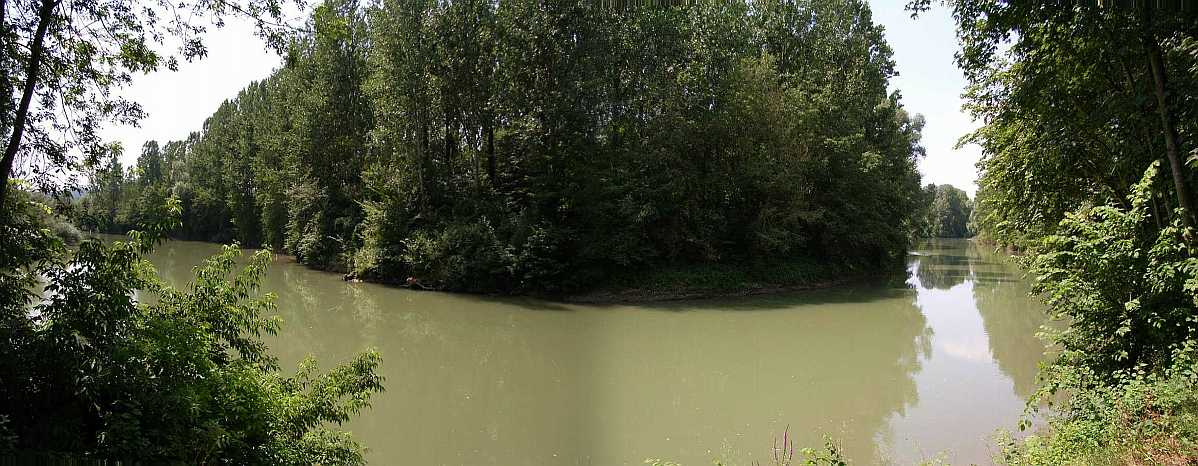
- The Aisne near the village of Soupir

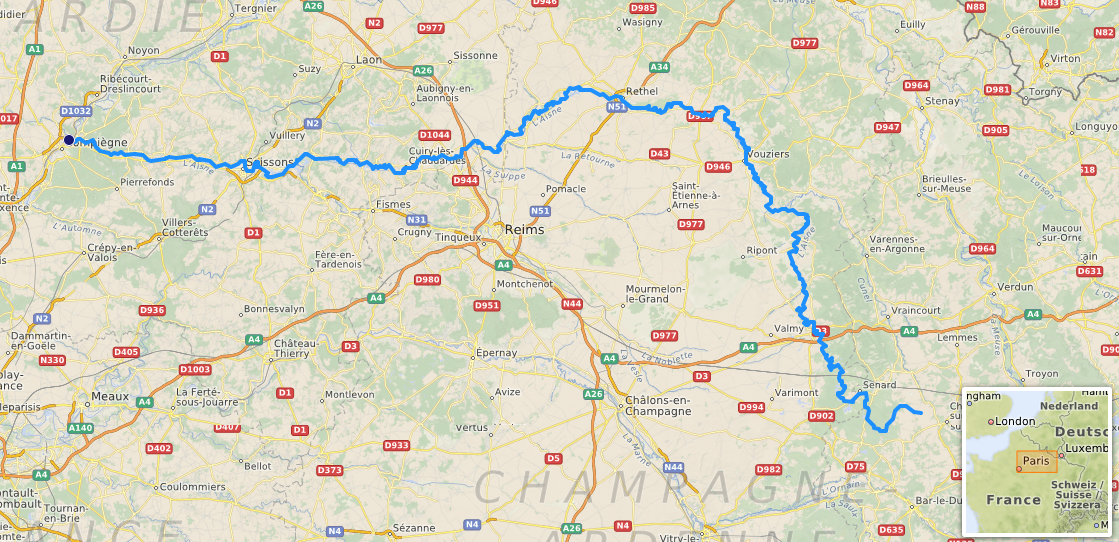

Location
- Country: France

Physical characteristics
- Source
  - location: Champagne-Ardenne
  - coordinates: 48°56′44″N 05°10′46″E
- Mouth
  - location: Oise
  - coordinates: 49°26′1″N 2°50′49″E
- Length: 356 km (221 mi)
- Basin size: 7,752 km^{2} (2,993 mi^{2})
- Discharge
  - average: 63 m^{3}/s (2,200 cu ft/s)

Basin features
- Progression: Oise→ Seine→ English Channel
- Tributaries
  - left: Ruisseau de l'Étang Neuf, Boue, Ante, Auve, Tourbe, Dormoise, Rémy Galère, Ruisseau des Sugnons, Ruisseau de l'Indre
  - right: Orne, Coubreuil, Sougniat, Biesme, Ruisseau du Fossé des Corbeaux, Aire, Ruisseau du Moulin, Ruisseau de Saint-Gourgon, Ruisseau des Ouvions, Ruisseau des Quatorze, Migny, Vaux, Ruisseau de Saint-Fergeux, Miette, Tordoir

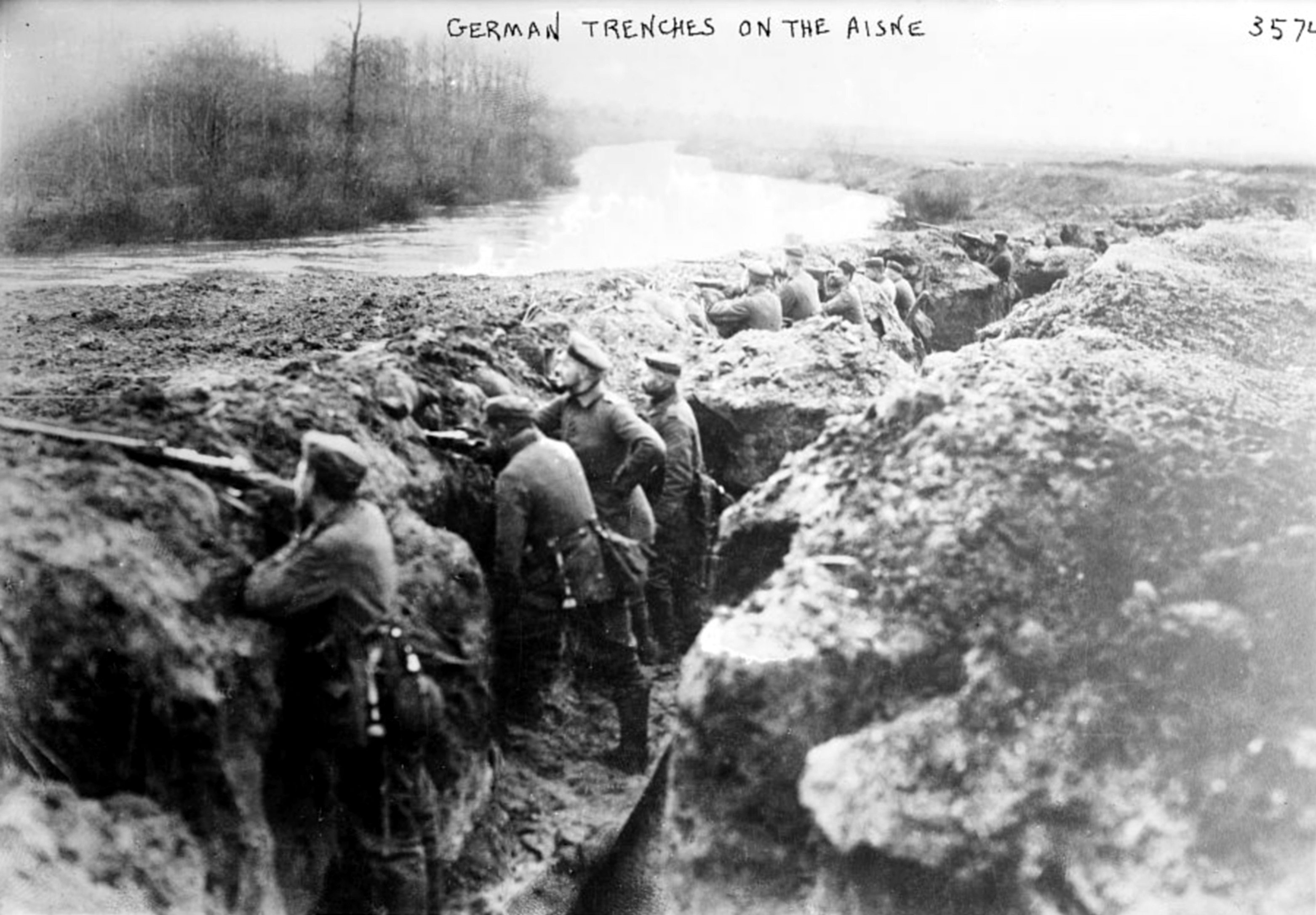
German trenches along the Aisne during World War I

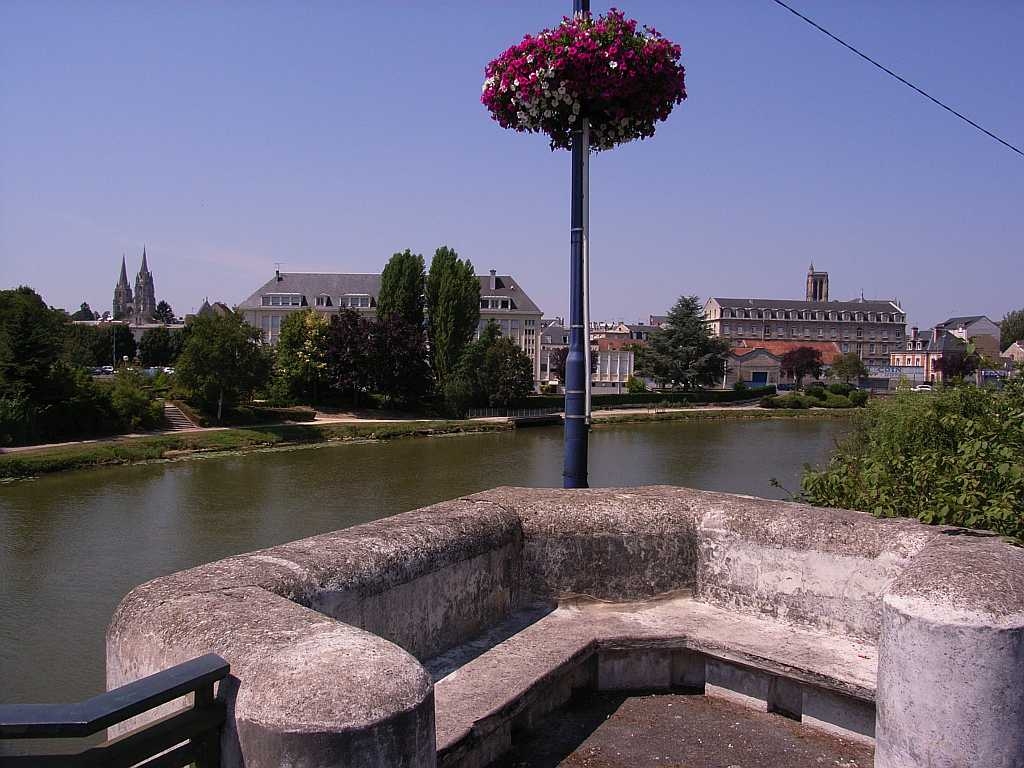
The Aisne running through Soissons

The Aisne (/eɪn/ ayn, US also /ɛn/ en, French: [ɛːn]; Picard: Ainne) is a river in northeastern France. It is a left tributary of the Oise. It gave its name to the French department of Aisne. It was known in the Roman period as Axona.

The river rises in the forest of Argonne, at Rembercourt-Sommaisne, near Sainte-Menehould. It flows north and then west before joining the Oise near Compiègne. The Aisne is 356 kilometres (221 mi) long. Its main tributaries are the Vesle, the Aire and the Suippe. The Battle of the Axona was fought between the Romans and the Belgae near the Aisne in 57 BC. Three Battles of the Aisne were fought in the Aisne valley during the First World War.

== Places along the river ==
Departments and towns along the river include:

- Meuse
- Marne: Sainte-Ménehould
- Ardennes: Vouziers, Rethel
- Aisne: Soissons
- Oise: Compiègne
- Aisne: Berny-Rivière

== Navigation ==
The river Aisne was used for commercial navigation as early as the Celtic period, and rafts were floated from a long distance above the present limit of navigation at Vailly-sur-Aisne until the mid-19th century. Canalisation works were begun in 1836, at the same time as construction of the Canal lateral à l'Aisne. The canal was completed first, in 1841, then two years later the river navigation. Commercial traffic in péniches carrying 220 tonnes is still active, while recreational traffic is mainly private boats. The waterway is 57 kilometres (35 mi) long, from the river Oise to the junction with the lateral canal, and has 7 locks. Through the lateral canal, it links with the Marne and the Canal de la Meuse.

=== En route ===
The kilometre distances continue the numbering from Canal latéral à l'Aisne from east to west.

- PK 51.3 is the end of the Canal latéral à l'Aisne
- PK 64.5 Villeneuve-Saint-Germain
- PK 67 Soissons
- PK 79 Fontenoy
- PK 85 Vic-sur-Aisne
- PK 92 Couloisy
- PK 104.5 Choisy-au-Bac
- PK 108 junction with Canal latéral à l'Oise upstream of Compiègne

== See also ==
- Rivers of France
- List of Canals in France
- Canal latéral à l'Aisne
- Chemin des Dames
- Battle of the Axona
