= Aubenton =

- Commune
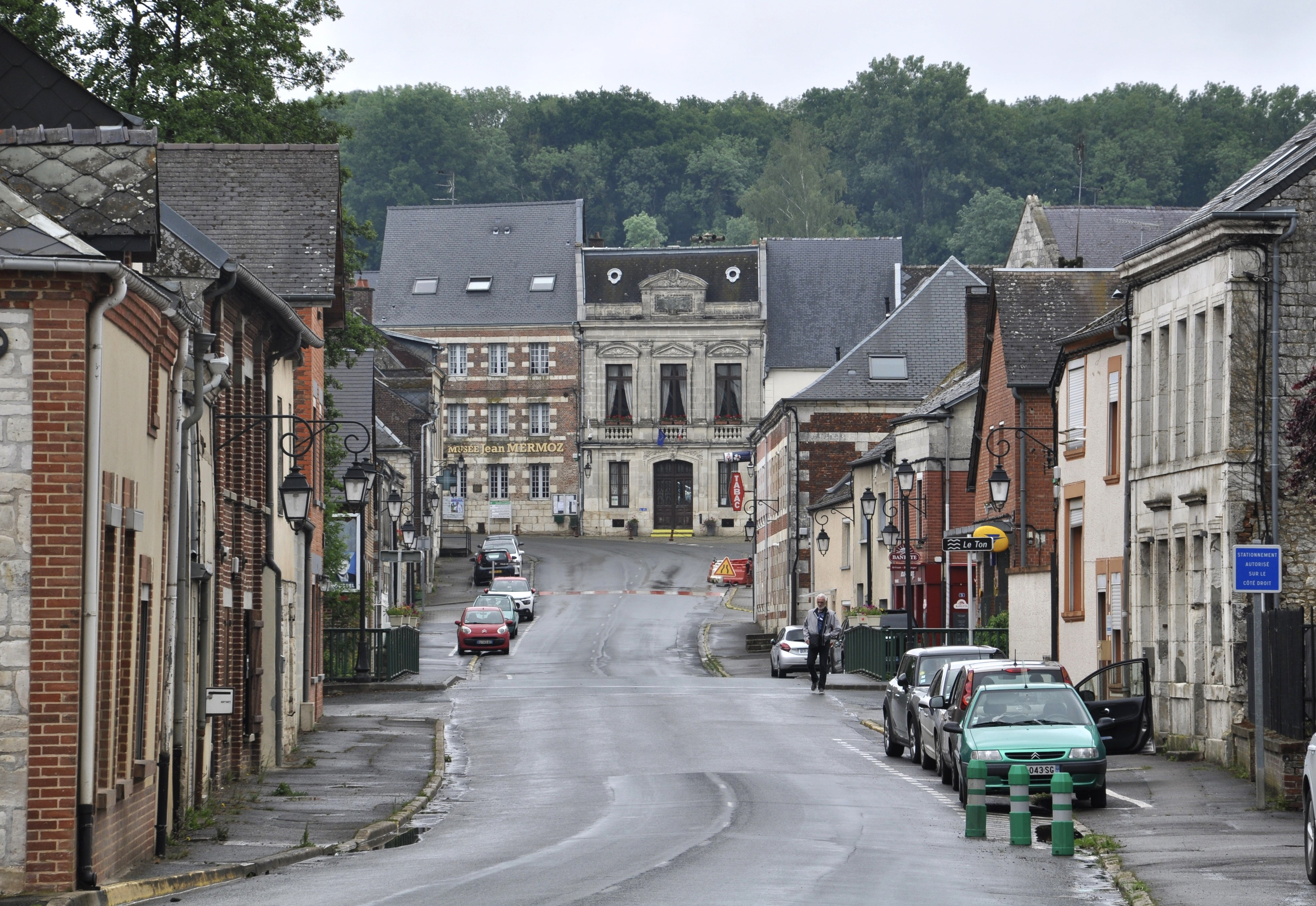
- Main street (Rue Saint-Nicolas + Rue Jean Mermoz)

- Coat of arms
- Location of Aubenton
- Location within France Location within Hauts-de-France
- Coordinates: 49°50′12″N 4°12′17″E
- Country: France
- Region: Hauts-de-France
- Department: Aisne
- Arrondissement: Vervins
- Canton: Hirson
- Intercommunality: Trois Rivières

Government
  - Mayor (2026–32): Didier Sercy
- Area^{1}: 23.7 km^{2} (9.2 sq mi)
- Elevation: 182 m (597 ft)
- Highest elevation: 259 m (850 ft)
- Lowest elevation: 168 m (551 ft)
- Population (2023): 658
  - Density: 27.8/km^{2} (71.9/sq mi)
- Time zone: UTC+01:00 (CET)
  - Summer (DST): UTC+02:00 (CEST)
- INSEE/Postal code: 02031 /02500
- ^{1} French Land Register data, which excludes lakes, ponds, glaciers > 1 km^{2} (0.386 sq mi or 247 acres) and river estuaries.

Aubenton (French pronunciation: [obɑ̃tɔ̃]) is a commune in the department of Aisne in the Hauts-de-France region of northern France.

== Geography ==
Aubenton derives its name from its location near the confluence (in the commune of Hannappes to the east) of the Aube and the Thon.

The commune is located some 70 km east of Saint-Quentin and 40 km west by northwest of Charleville-Mézières. The D 1043 (E44) road from Hirson to Charleville-Mézières runs along the northern border of the commune. The town can be accessed from this road by the D 5 road running southeast or the D 37 road running south-west. The D 5 road continues through the commune and south, changing to the D 977, and continuing to Rozoy-sur-Serre. The D 37 road continues west from the village to Besmont. There is also the D 38 road from Leuze in the west passing through the village and continuing to Hannappes in the east. The railway from Hirson to Charleville-Mézières also passes through the commune following the course of the river Thon but there is no station in the commune, the nearest being at Liart to the east. The commune is about 80% farmland with the rest extensive forests in the south. There are a number of hamlets other than the village. These are:

- Bas Val La Caure
- Buirefontaine
- Haute Val la Caure
- Hurtebise
- La Rue Larcher
- Le Bois Carbonnet
- Ribeauville
- Saint-Nicholas

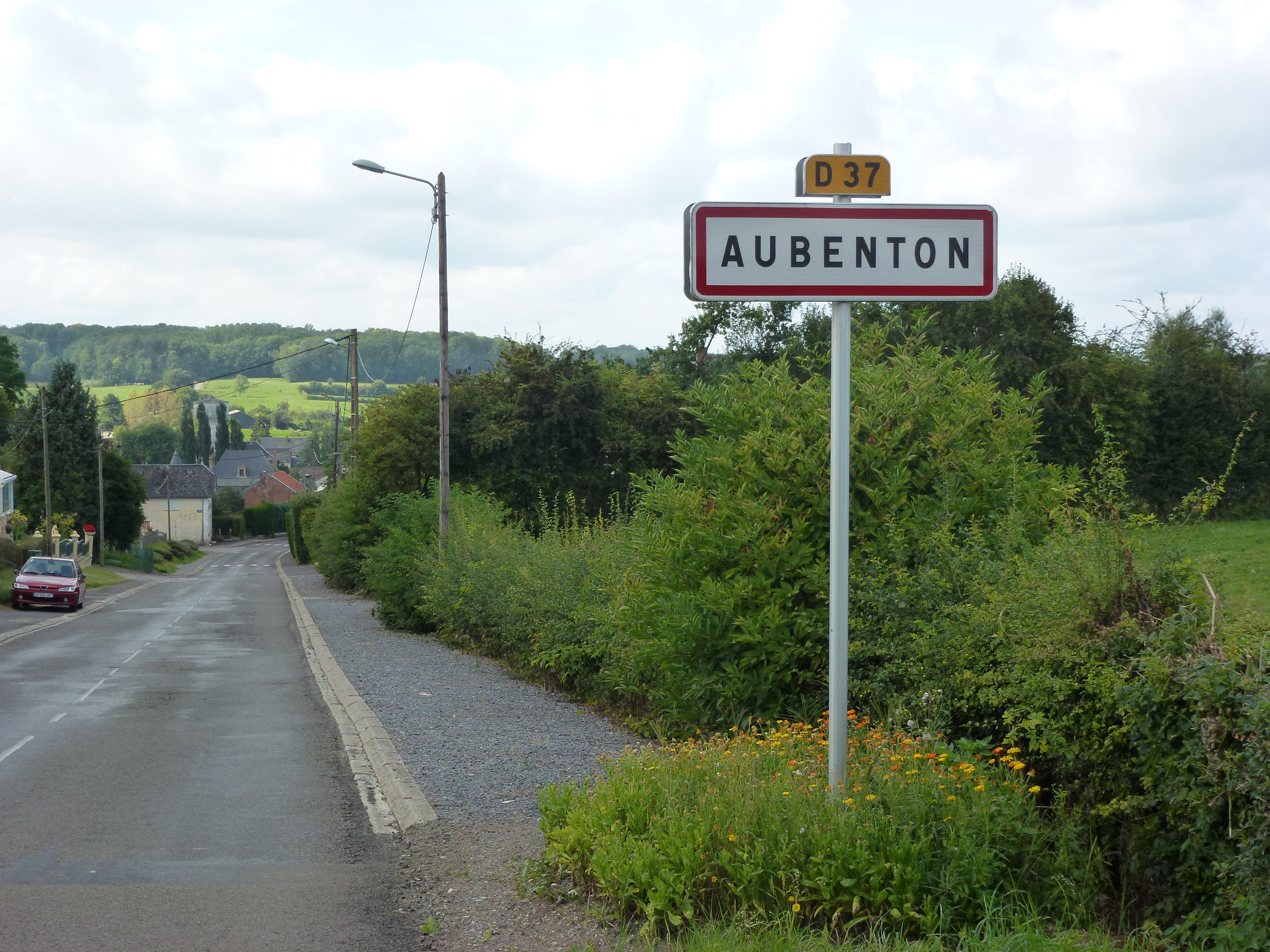
Entrance to the village

The river Thon flows from east to west through the north of the commune eventually joining the Oise at Étréaupont. The Ruisseau du Bois Carbonnet rises in the south of the commune, discharging into the Ruisseau de l'Étang Polliart, a tributary of the Thon.

Aubenton is surrounded by 7 communes: Brunehamel, Iviers, Beaumé, Leuze, Any-Martin-Rieux, Logny-lès-Aubenton, and Mont-Saint-Jean.

== History ==
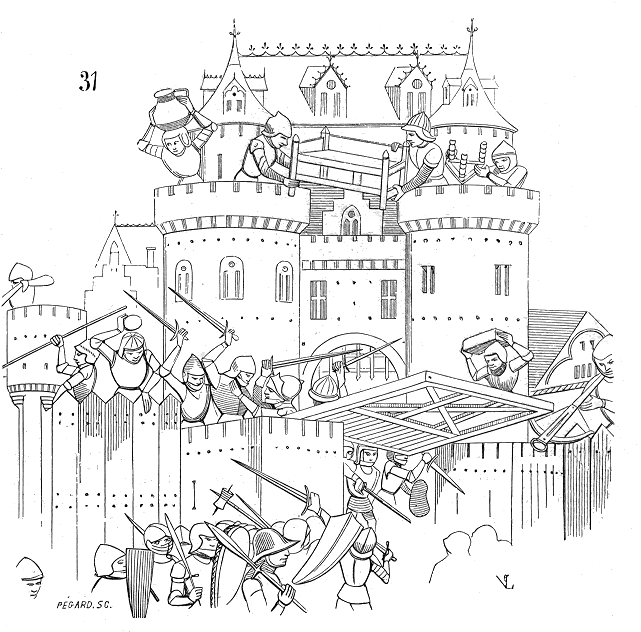
A drawing of the attack on the town walls by the Count of Hainaut

=== Second World War ===
The department of Aisne has 10 people designated "Righteous Among the Nations" (French people who helped Jews during the war), of whom 3 were from Aubenton:

- Emile Fontaine (a street bears his name)
- Annette Pierron, his girlfriend at the time
- Camille Pierron, mother of Annette and the owner of a farm at Buirefontaine

Shot by the Gestapo on the Aubenton-Besmont road (D37) on 30 March 1944, Emile Fontaine was recognized as a captain in the French Forces of the Interior (FFI) after the Liberation. All three had saved 10 escapees from the "Judenlager of Mazures" who hid for a time at Buirefontaine.

=== Heraldry ===
Arms of Aubenton	Blazon: Or, a Castle in gules masoned in sable with three ports open.

== Administration ==
List of Successive Mayors of Aubenton

Mayors from the 17th century to 1926

From	To	Name
1640	1648	Roland Dobsen
1848	1649	Dormet
1649	1688	Nicolas Deswatines
1688	1694	Dormet
1694	1704	Jean Grégoire de l'Etang-Neuf
1704	1708	Martin Brucelle
1708	1753	Louis Dambraine
1754	1763	Jacques Coyer
1763	1790	Jacques Pierre Coyer
1790	1800	Louis Antoine Sorlin
1800	1816	Nicolas de Villelongue
1816	1830	Joseph Petit
1830	1831	Edouard Marie Louis Ternaux
1831	1836	César Millet
1836	1840	Paul Emile Barbier
1840	1848	Célestin Landragin
1848	1849	Joseph Millet
1848	1850	Joseph Prud'homme
1850	1870	Célestin Landragin
1871	1902	Isidore Cabaret
1902	1909	Henri Cabaret
1908	1914	Juramie
1914	1919	Procureur
1919	1926	Fernand Dizy

Mayors from 1926

From	To	Name	Party	Position
1926	1946	Henri Bouxin		
1946	1971	Charles Dejume		
1971	1973	Marcel Ferraris		
1973	1983	Guy Navaux		
1983	1989	Christian Pillot		
1989	2001	René Sablin	PCF	
2001	2013	Bernard Noé	UMP	General Council Member (2001-2013)
2013	2020	Denise Charlier	DVD	
2020	2026	Bernard Grehant		
2026	incumbent	Didier Sercy		

== Population ==
Historical population
Year	Pop.	±% p.a.
1968	1,078	—
1975	1,002	−1.04%
1982	969	−0.48%
1990	826	−1.98%
1999	713	−1.62%
2007	703	−0.18%
2012	679	−0.69%
2017	657	−0.66%
2023	658	+0.03%
Source: INSEE

== Culture and heritage ==
The commune has a very large number of buildings and sites that are registered as historical monuments. An abridged list of the most prominent historical monuments is shown below.

=== Civil heritage ===
- The Girls' School (1876)
- The War memorial (1920)
- The Town Hall (1868). The Town Hall contains two items that are registered as historical objects:
  - A Bust: Marianne (19th century)
  - A Bust: Lieutenant André Bouxin (20th century)
- Le Chalet Industrial House (1906). The house contains a Fountain (19th century) which is registered as an historical object.
- The Railway Station (1885)
- The old Hotel Collin (13th century) now the Jean Mermoz Museum. The Museum contains several items which are registered as historical objects:
  - A Bas-relief: Arms surmounted by lions (16th century)
  - A Bust: Jean Mermoz (20th century)
  - A Bas-relief: Jean Mermoz as an aviator (1937)
  - A Bas-relief: Jean Mermoz (20th century)
  - A Lamp called the Lampedaire of Jean Mermoz (1913)
  - Jean Mermoz's Cradle (19th century)
  - A Commemorative plaque for Jean Mermoz (1937)
- The old Flour Mill (18th century)
- The old City Walls (14th century) of which only two remain of the original seven towers: the Tour de Chimay (in the Tower lane) has been transformed into a cottage managed by the commune. Another tower on private land is visible from the road along the Thon

=== Religious heritage ===
- The Fortified Parish Church of Notre-Dame (12th century) There are also a very large number of registered historical objects contained in the Church.
- A Funeral Monument to André Bouxin (1884). The monument is surmounted by a large Statue: André Bouxin in a lieutenant's uniform (1925) which is registered as an historical object.

== Photo gallery ==
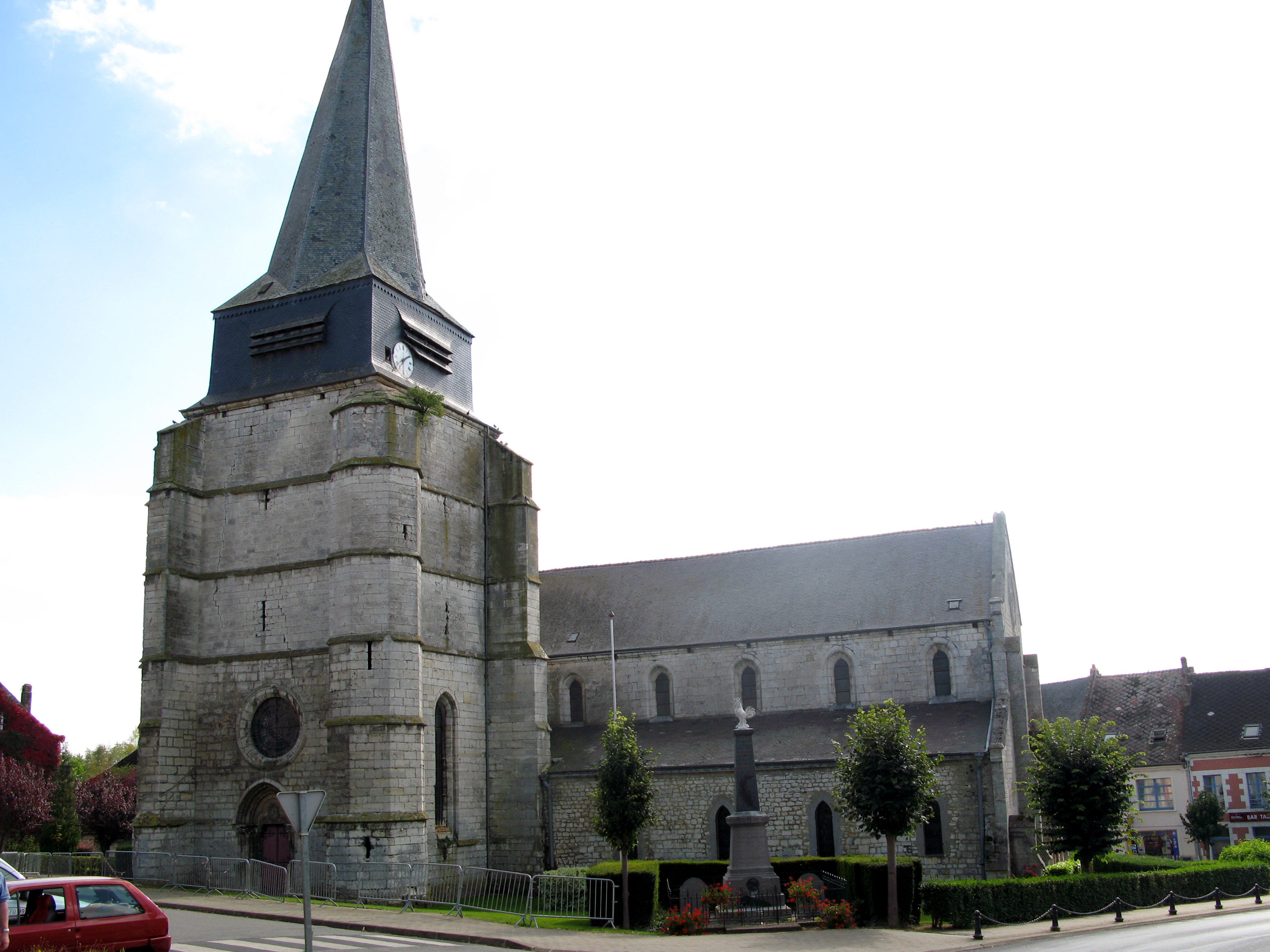
During the European Heritage Days in 2007, metal barriers prevented access to the church.

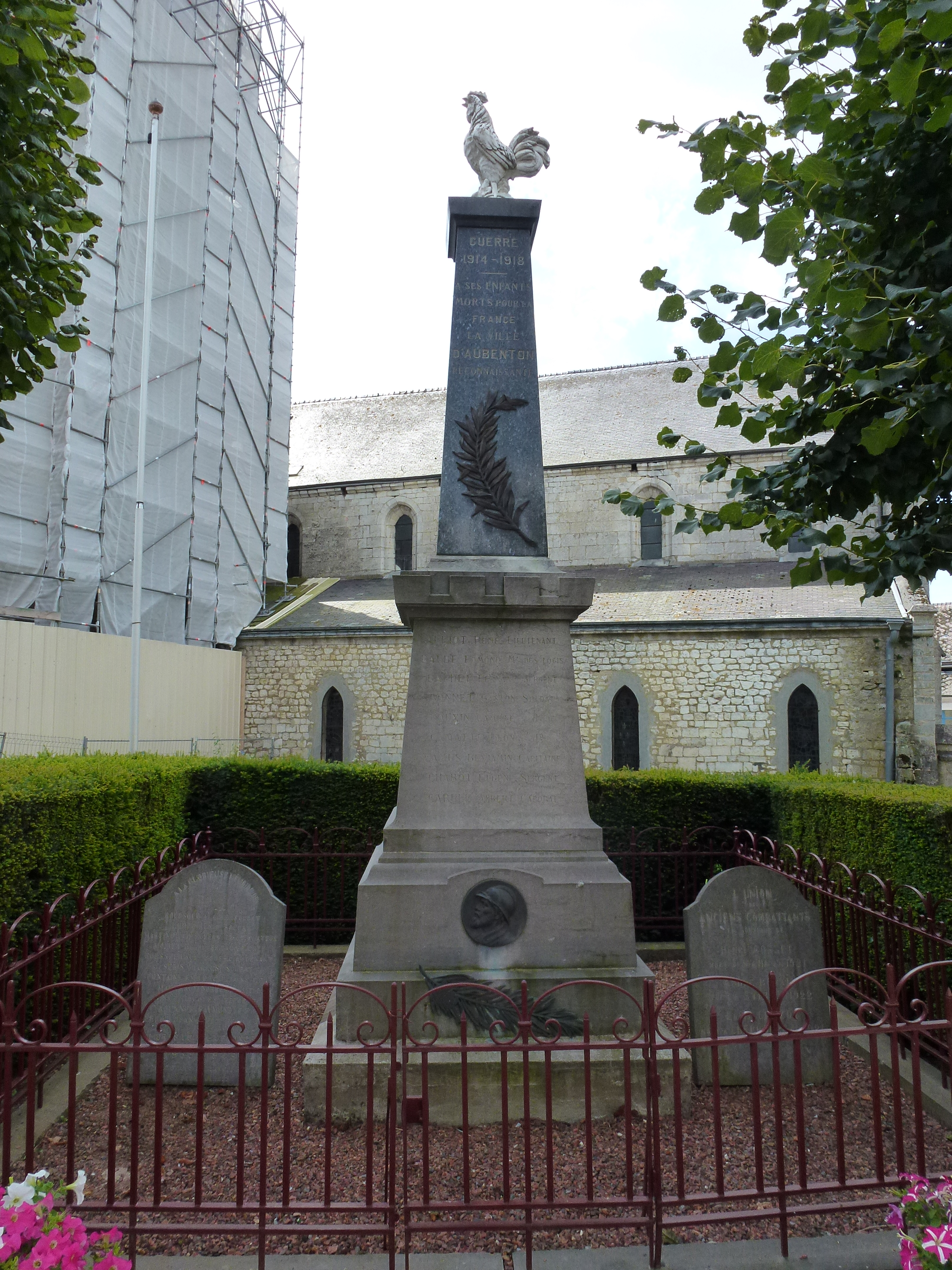
The War Memorial

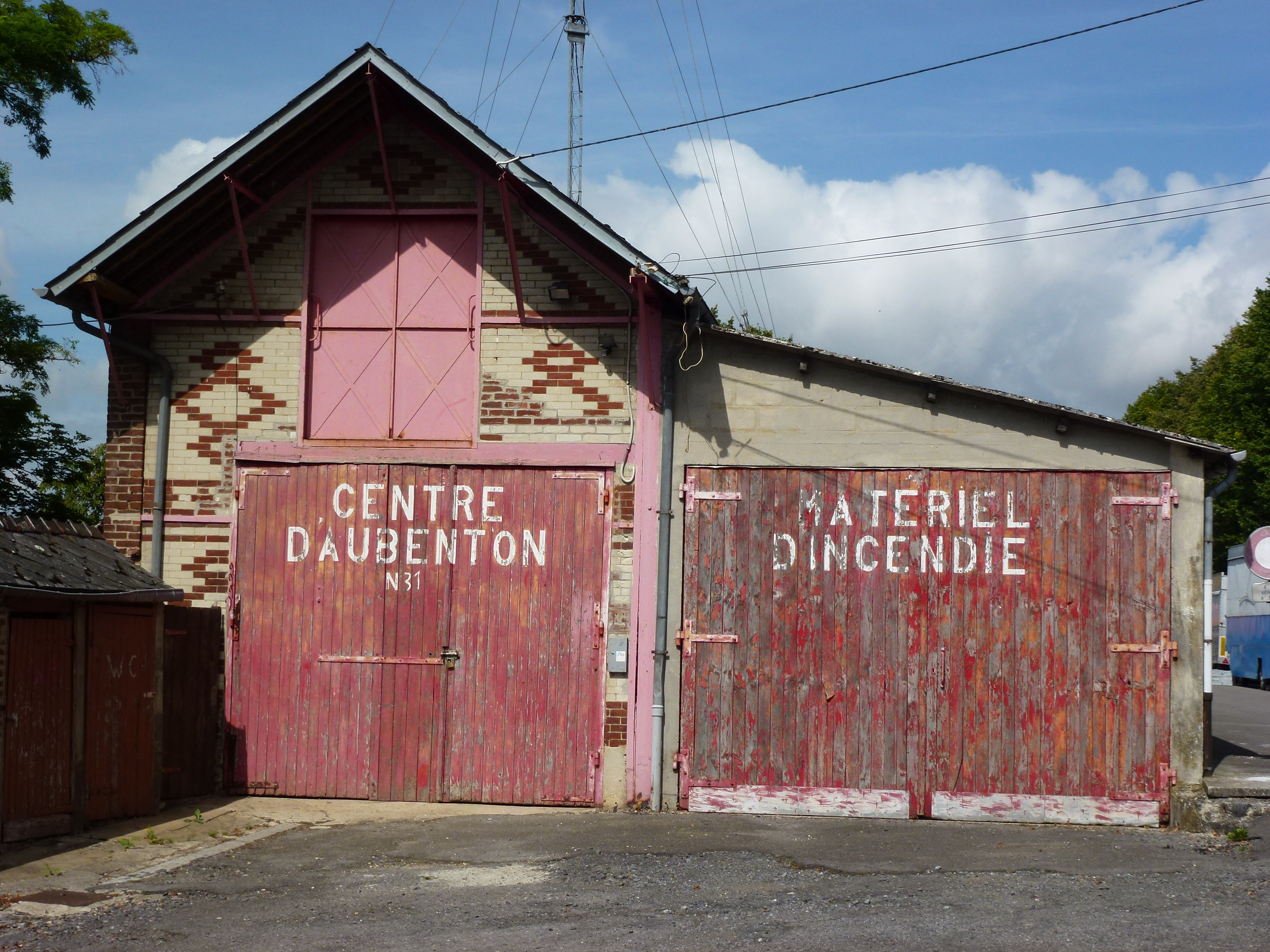
The Fire Station

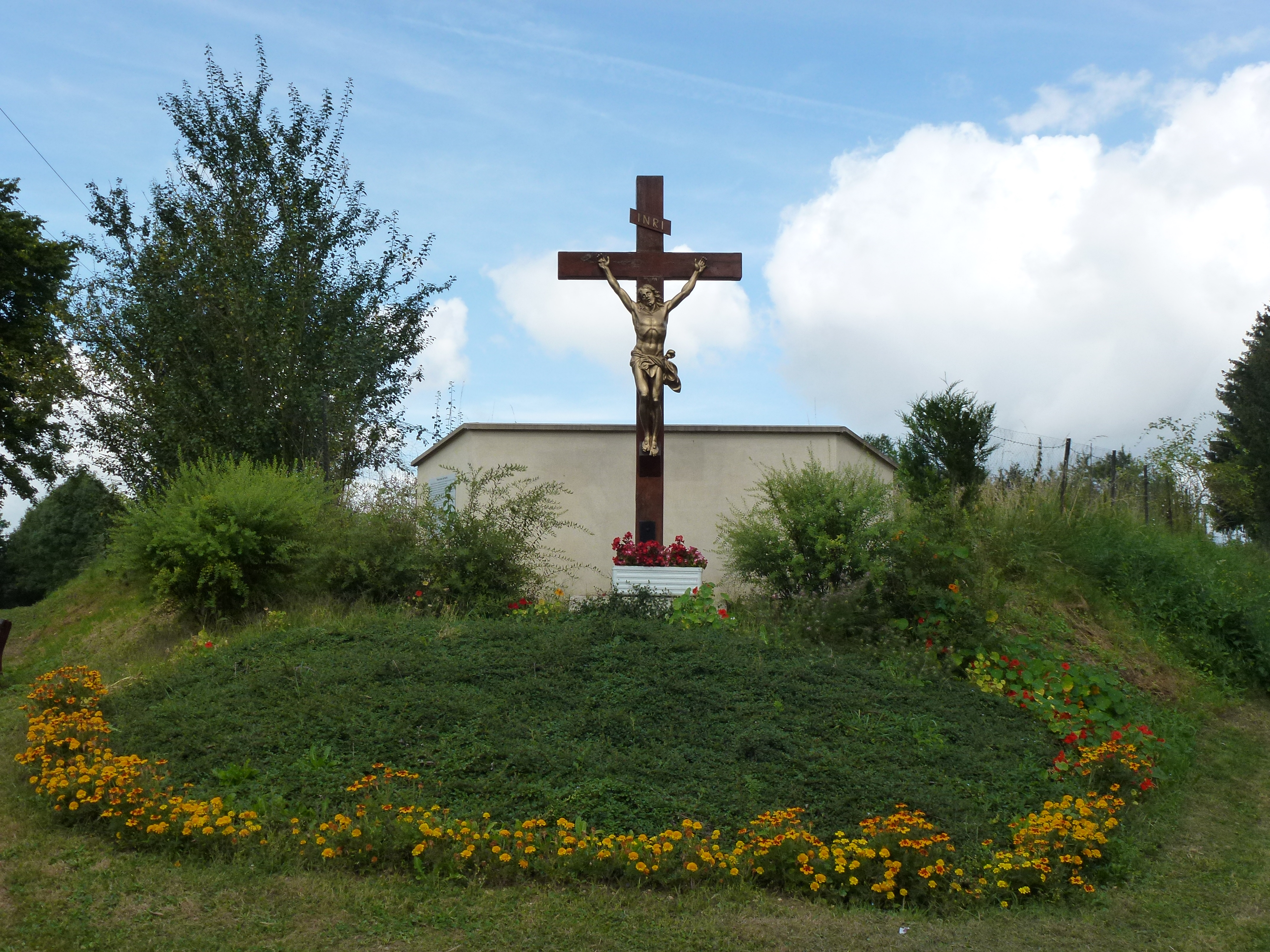
Wayside Cross

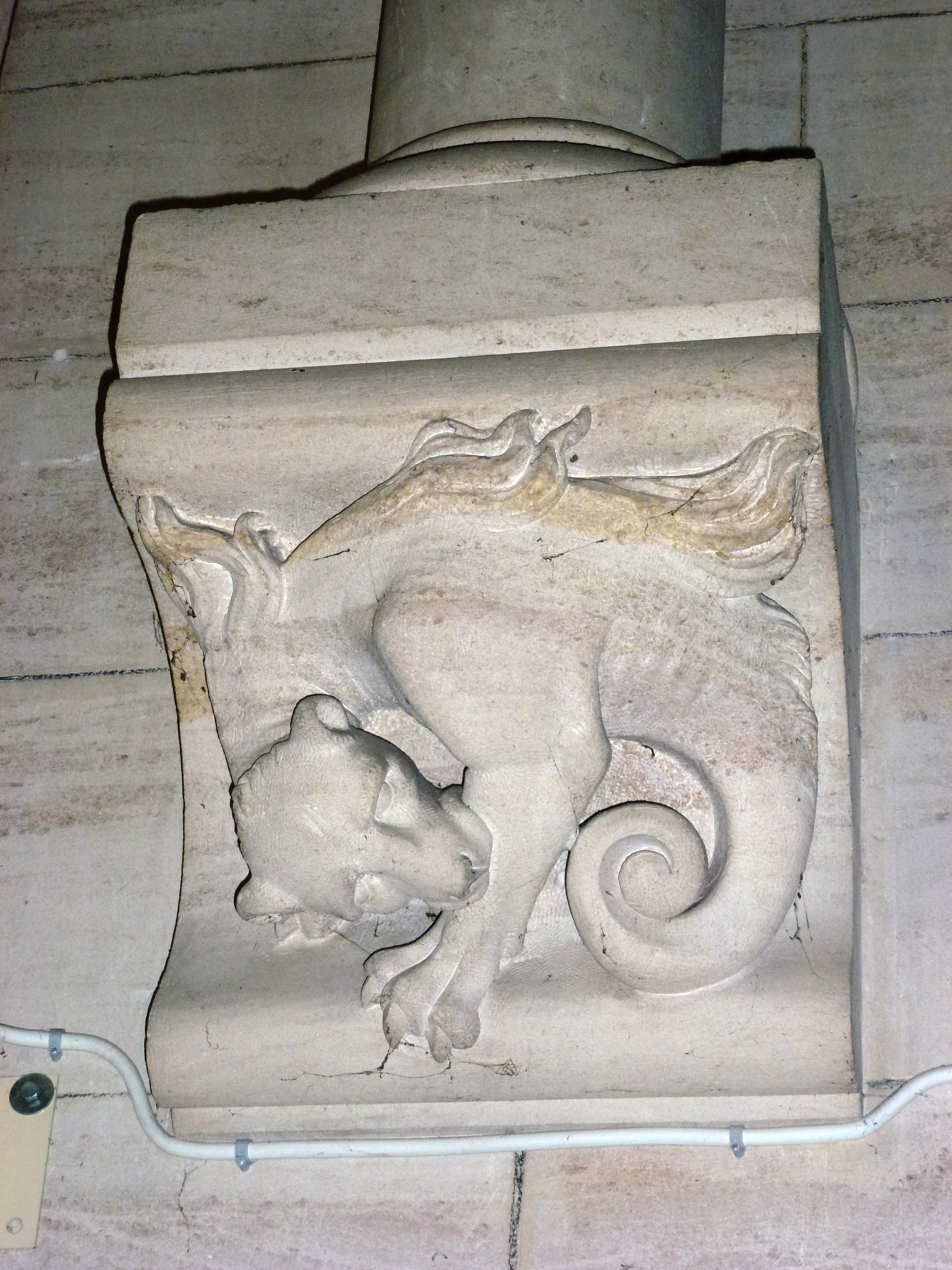
A capital in the church

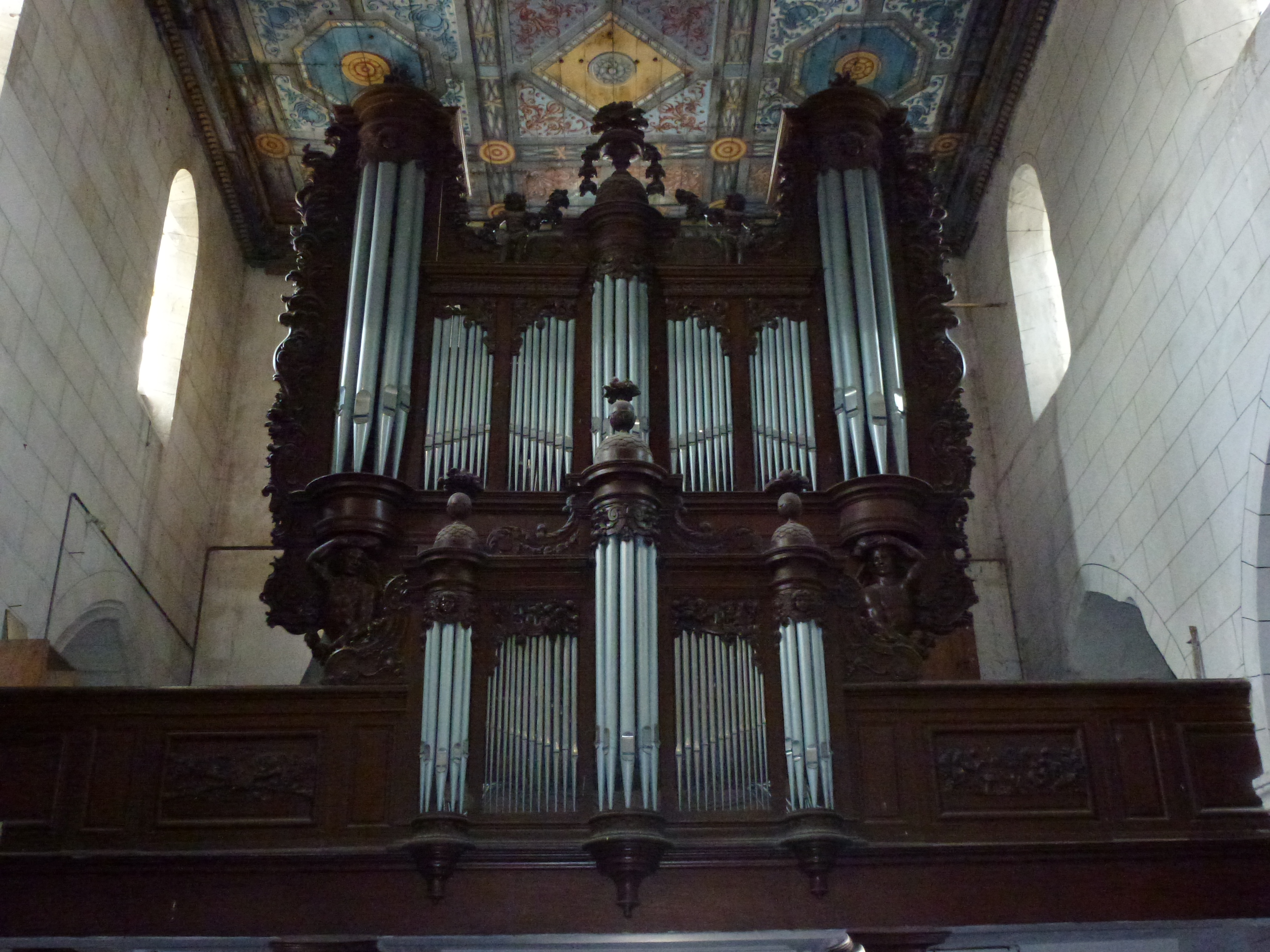
The church organ

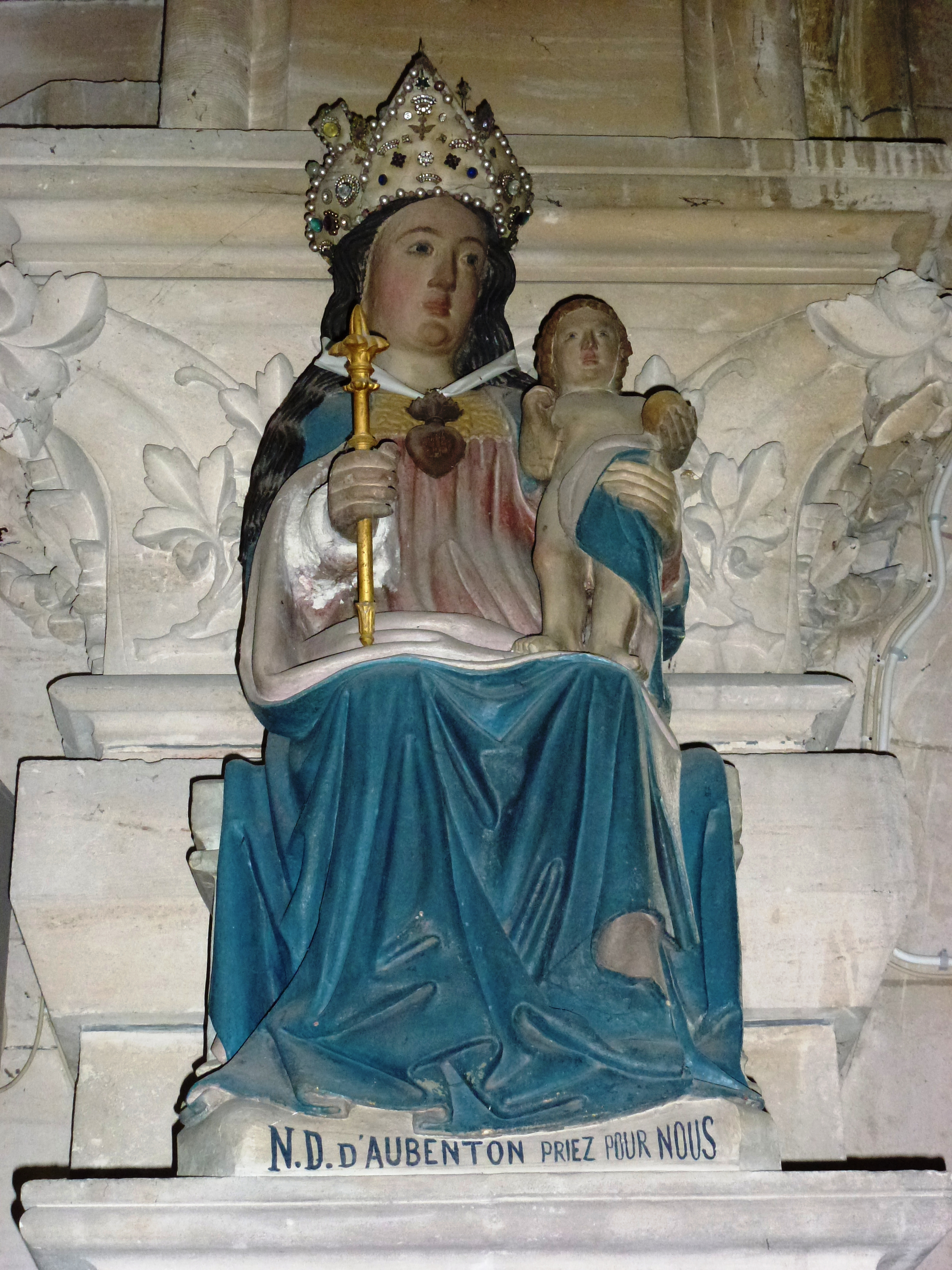
Statue of Notre Dame in the church

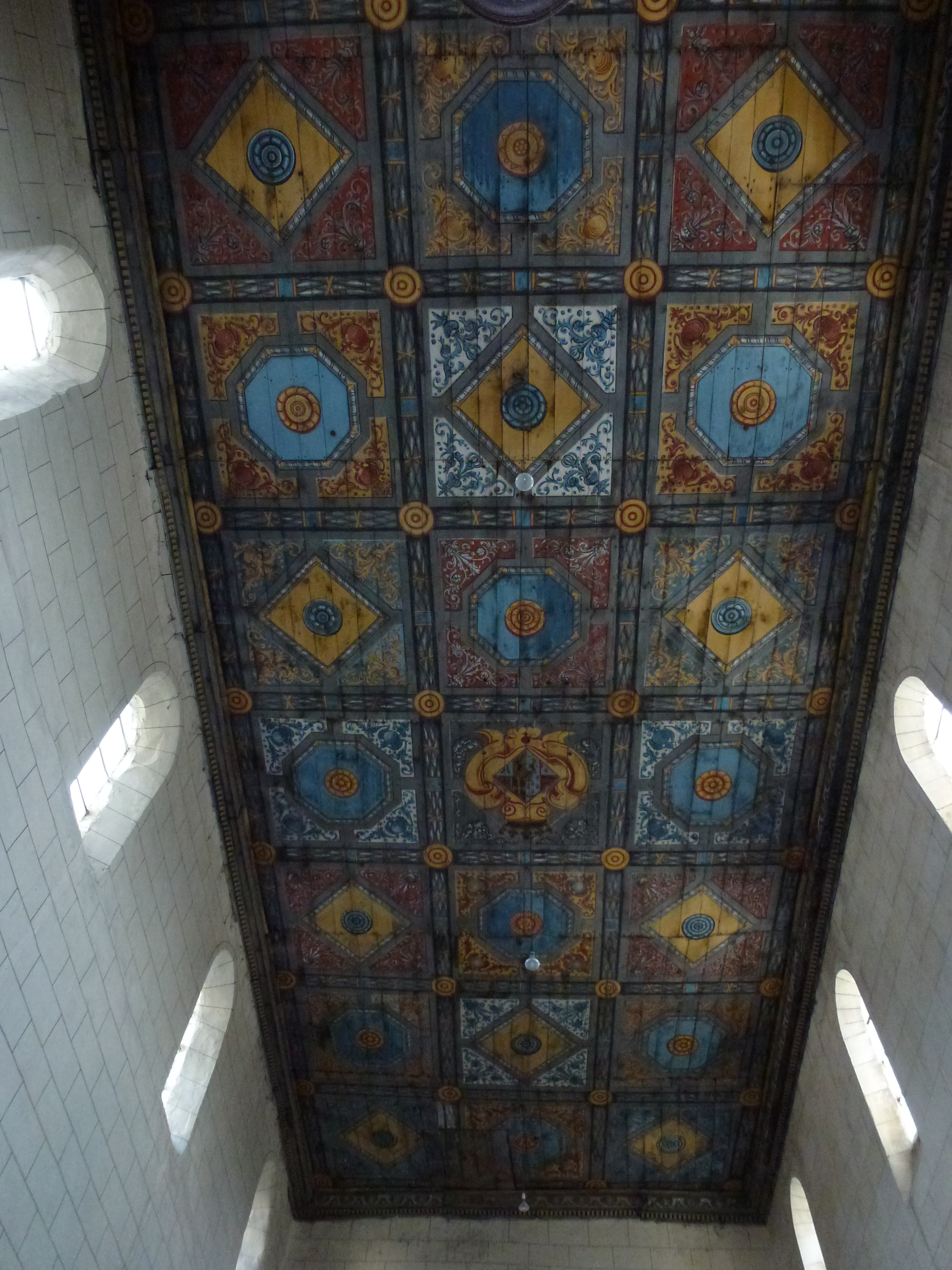
Ceiling in the church

== Notable people linked to the commune ==
- Jean Mermoz, aviator.
- Joseph Nelson Soye, doctor and MP
- Emile Fontaine, Annette Pierron, and Camille Pierron, resistance fighters and "Righteous Among the Nations"

== See also ==
- Communes of the Aisne department
