= Les Autels =

- Commune
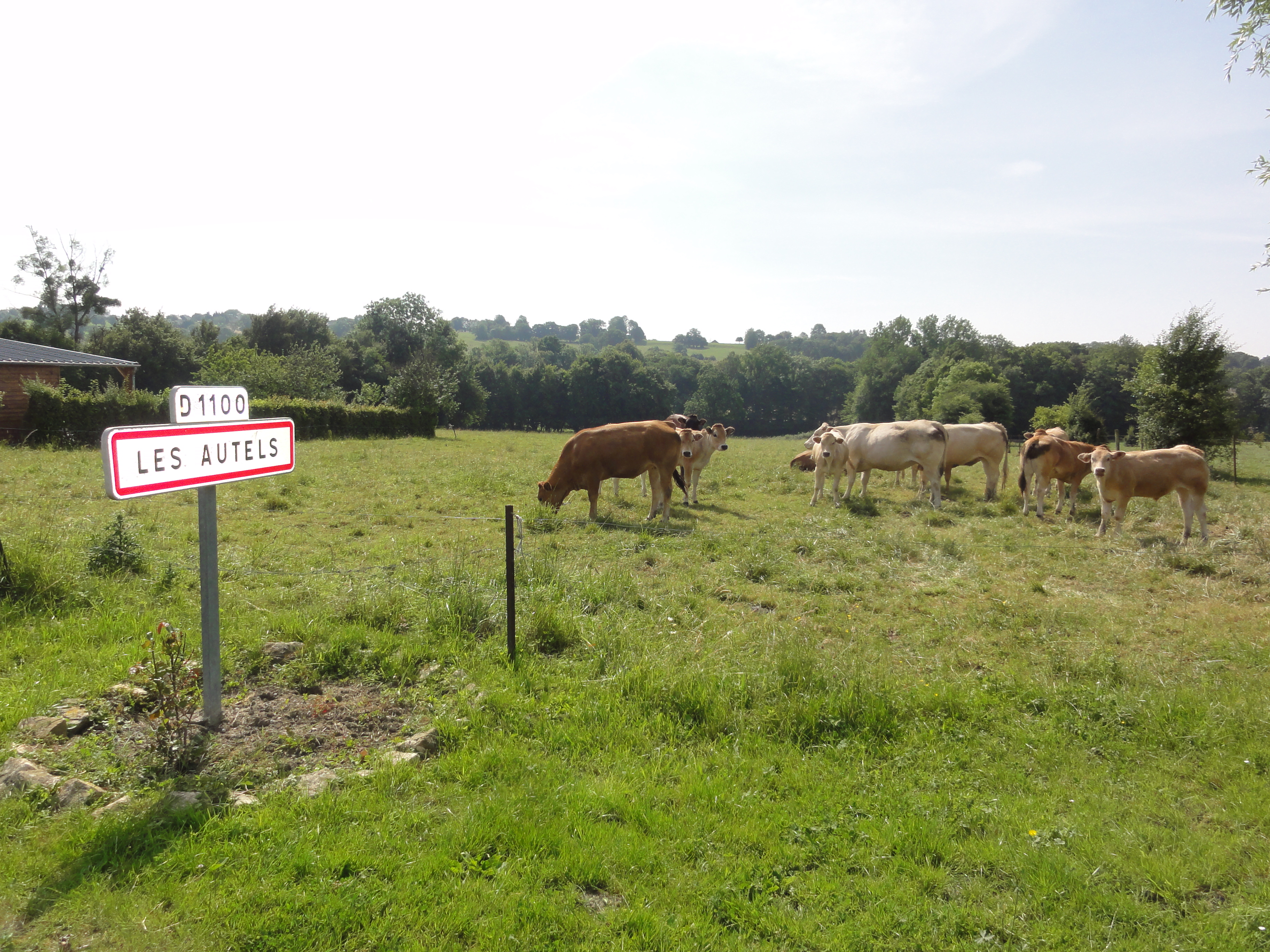
- Location of Les Autels
- Location within France Location within Hauts-de-France
- Coordinates: 49°45′51″N 4°13′33″E
- Country: France
- Region: Hauts-de-France
- Department: Aisne
- Arrondissement: Vervins
- Canton: Vervins
- Intercommunality: Portes de la Thiérache

Government
  - Mayor (2026–32): Éric Halle
- Area^{1}: 5.99 km^{2} (2.31 sq mi)
- Highest elevation: 260 m (850 ft)
- Lowest elevation: 178 m (584 ft)
- Population (2023): 62
  - Density: 10/km^{2} (27/sq mi)
- Time zone: UTC+01:00 (CET)
  - Summer (DST): UTC+02:00 (CEST)
- INSEE/Postal code: 02038 /02360
- ^{1} French Land Register data, which excludes lakes, ponds, glaciers > 1 km^{2} (0.386 sq mi or 247 acres) and river estuaries.

Les Autels (French pronunciation: [le.z‿otɛl]) is a commune in the department of Aisne in the Hauts-de-France region of northern France.

== Geography ==
Les Autels is located some 35 km west of Charleville-Mézières and 10 km south of Aubenton. The northern and eastern borders of the commune are the departmental border between Aisne and Ardennes. Access to the commune is by the D1100 road from Brunehamel in the west which passes through the village and continues south to join the D530 south of the village. The D530 goes north in the commune changing to the D10B at the border and continues north to Blanchefosse-et-Bay. Apart from the village there is also the hamlet of Haut-Chemin south of the village. The commune is mostly farmland with some scattered forests.

The Ruisseau du Moulin Bataille flows through the north of the commune towards the southwest forming part of the western border before continuing south to join the Serre near Mainbresson. An unnamed stream rises near the village and flows southwest to join the Ruisseau du Moulin Bataille.

=== Neighbouring communes and villages ===
Source:

== Administration ==
List of Successive Mayors

From	To	Name
2001	incumbent	Eric Halle

== Demography ==
Historical population

Year	Pop.	±% p.a.
1793	319	—
1821	447	+1.21%
1846	554	+0.86%
1872	431	−0.96%
1901	241	−1.98%
1926	189	−0.97%
1946	168	−0.59%
1962	146	−0.87%
1968	146	+0.00%

Year	Pop.	±% p.a.
1975	118	−3.00%
1982	89	−3.95%
1990	99	+1.34%
1999	74	−3.18%
2007	75	+0.17%
2012	75	+0.00%
2017	57	−5.34%
2023	62	+1.41%

Source: EHESS and INSEE

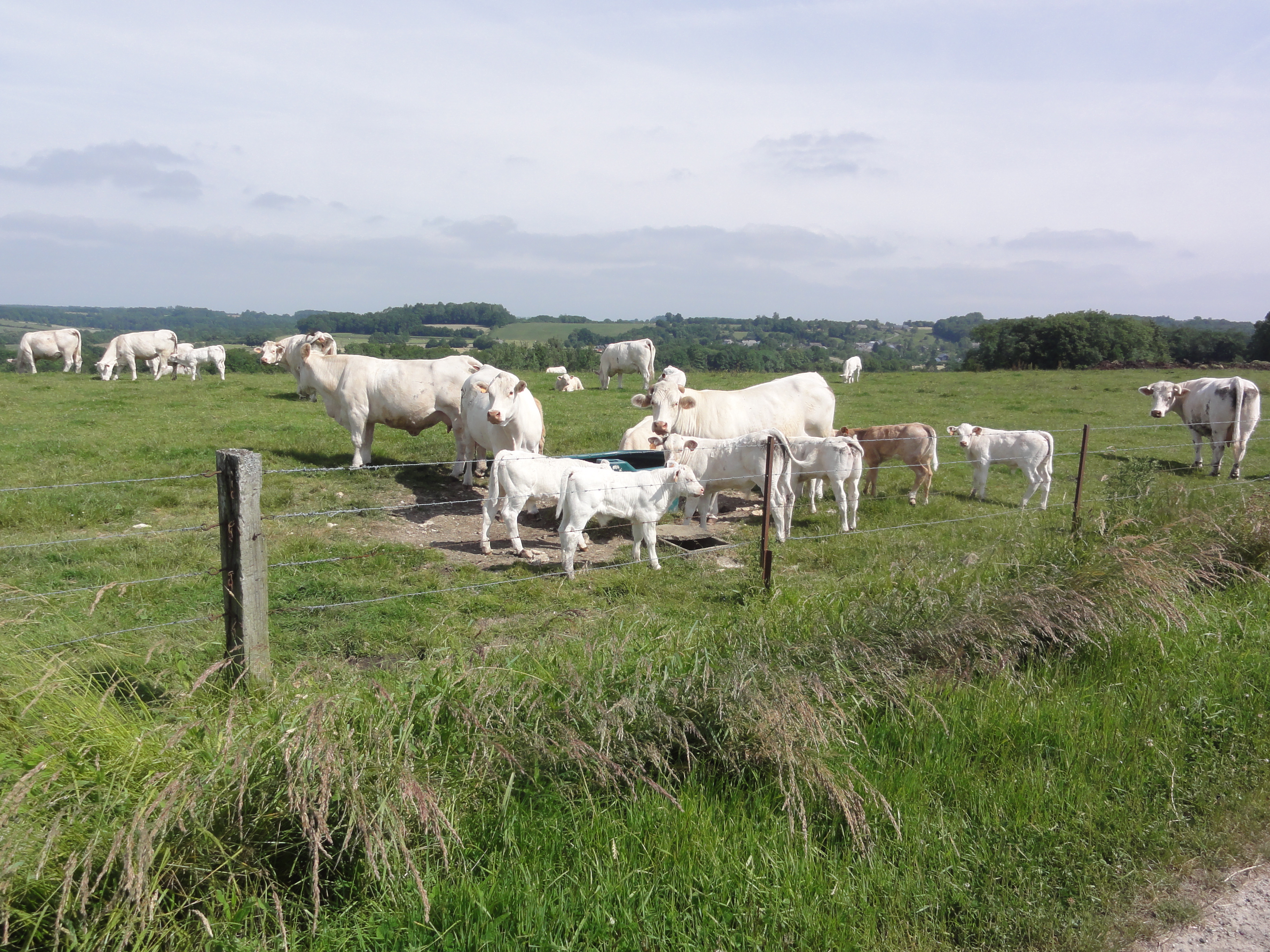
Countryside in Les Autels

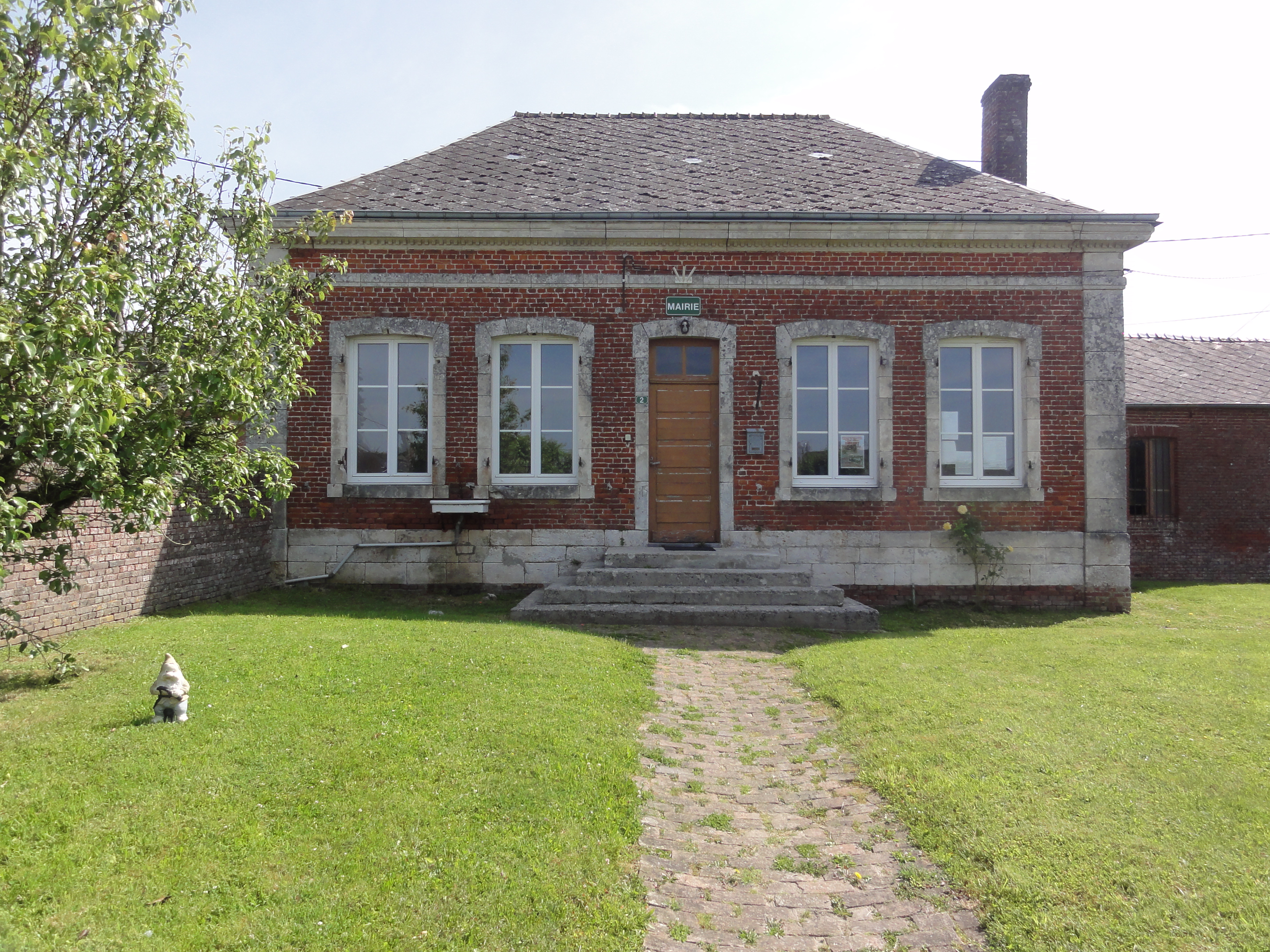
The Town Hall

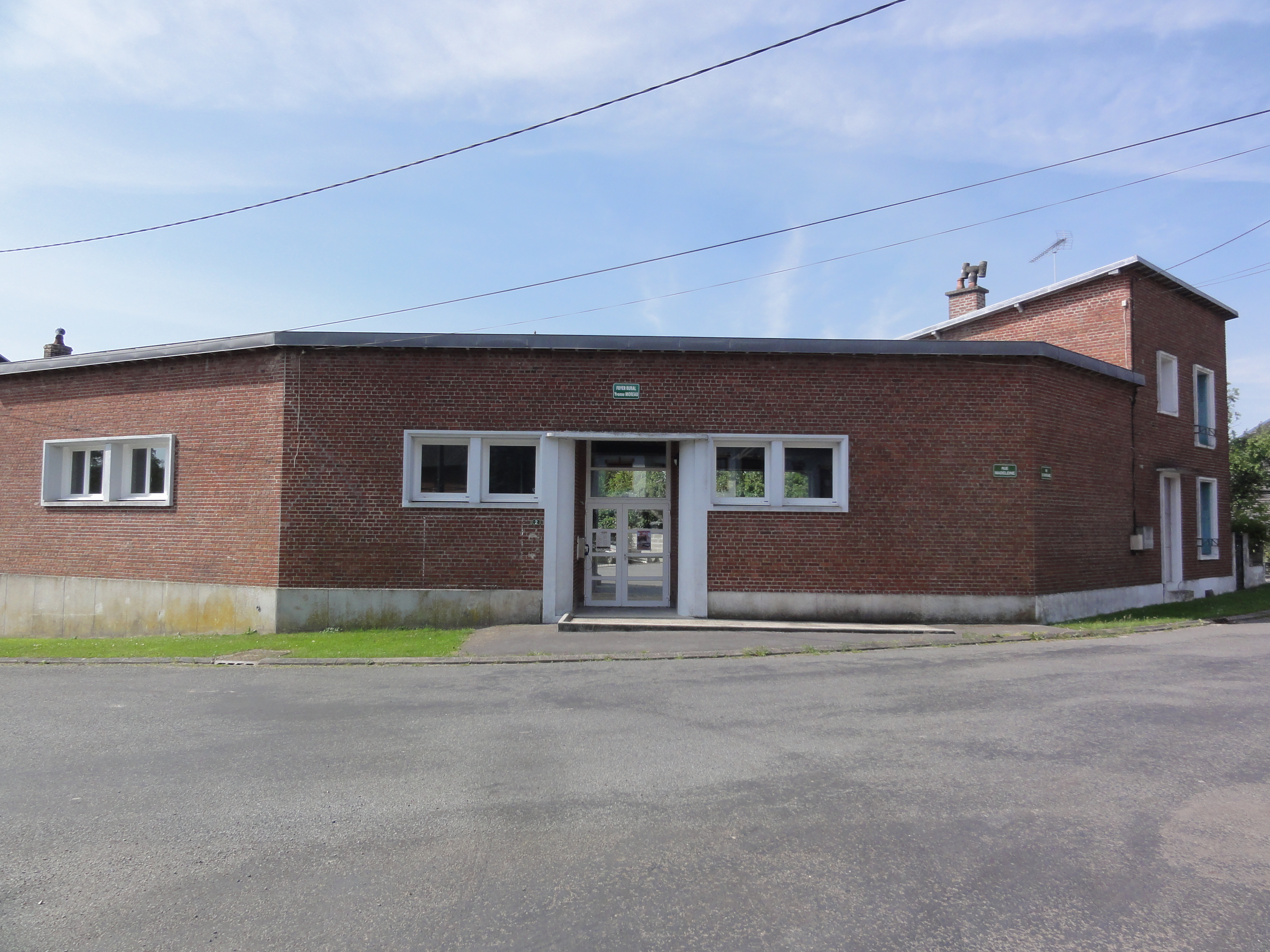
The Rural Hall

== Sites and monuments ==
- The Church of Saint-Nicolas
- The War Memorial
- The Lavoir (Public laundry)
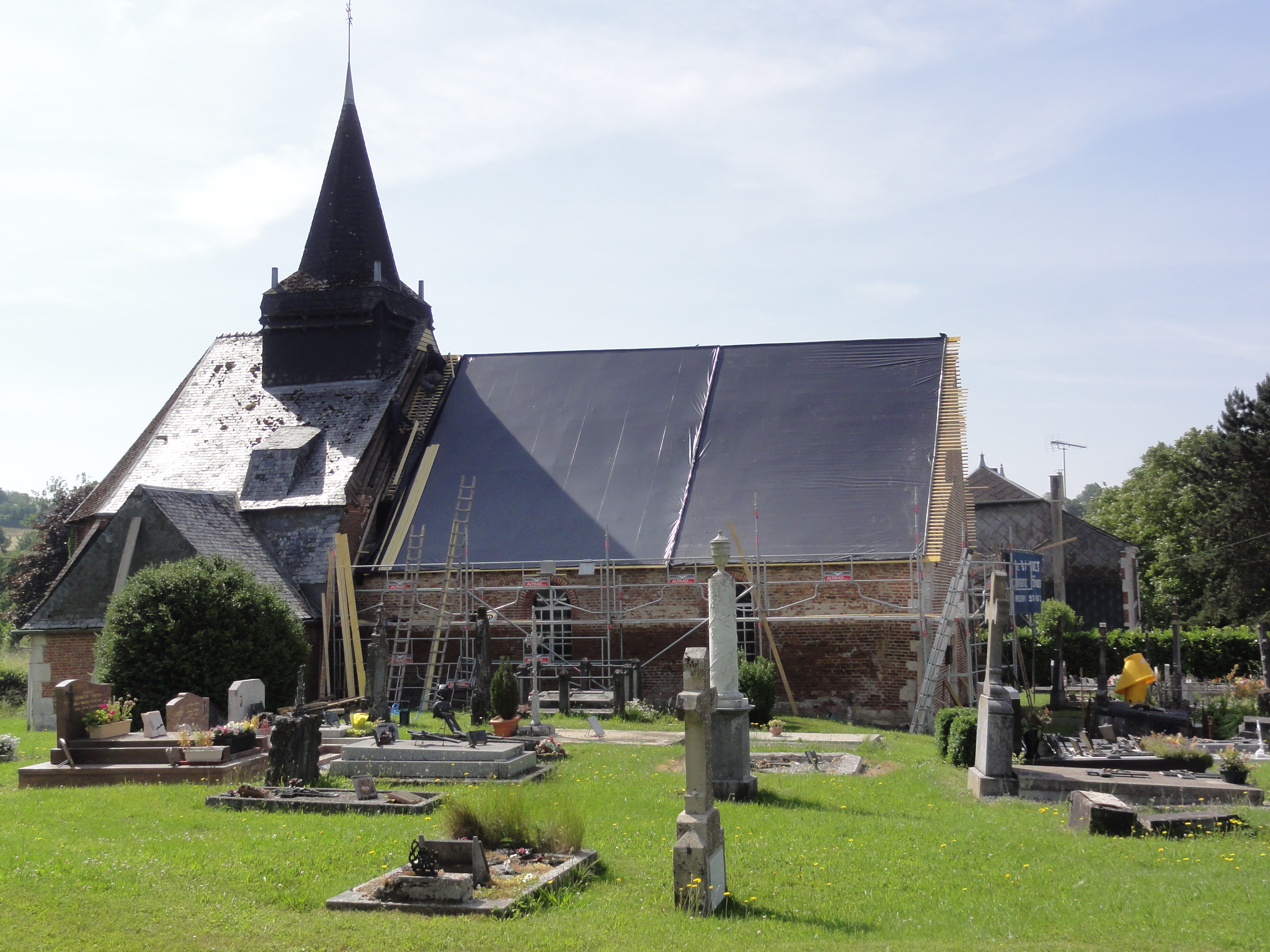
The Church grounds

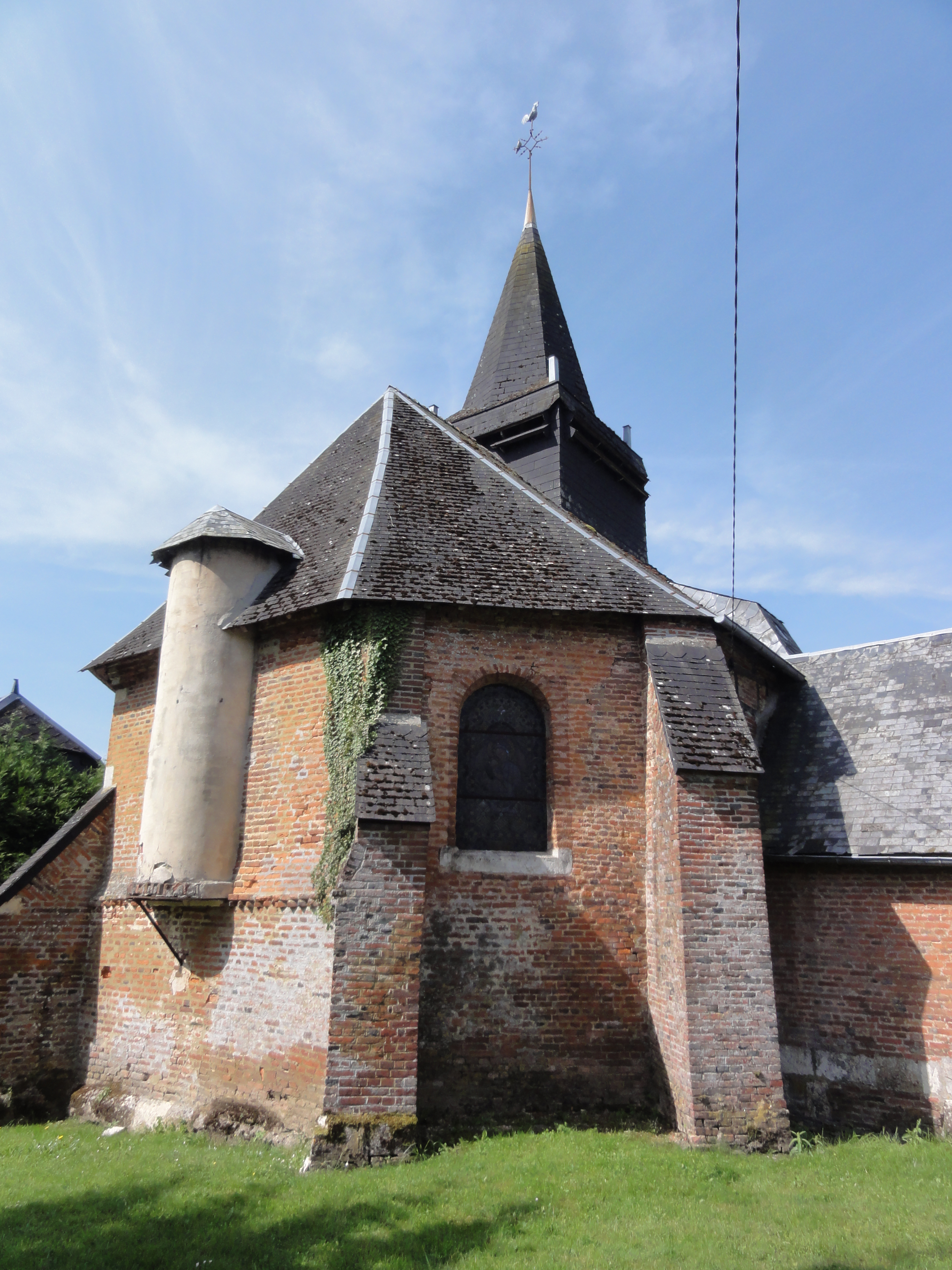
The Chevet of the Church of Saint-Nicolas

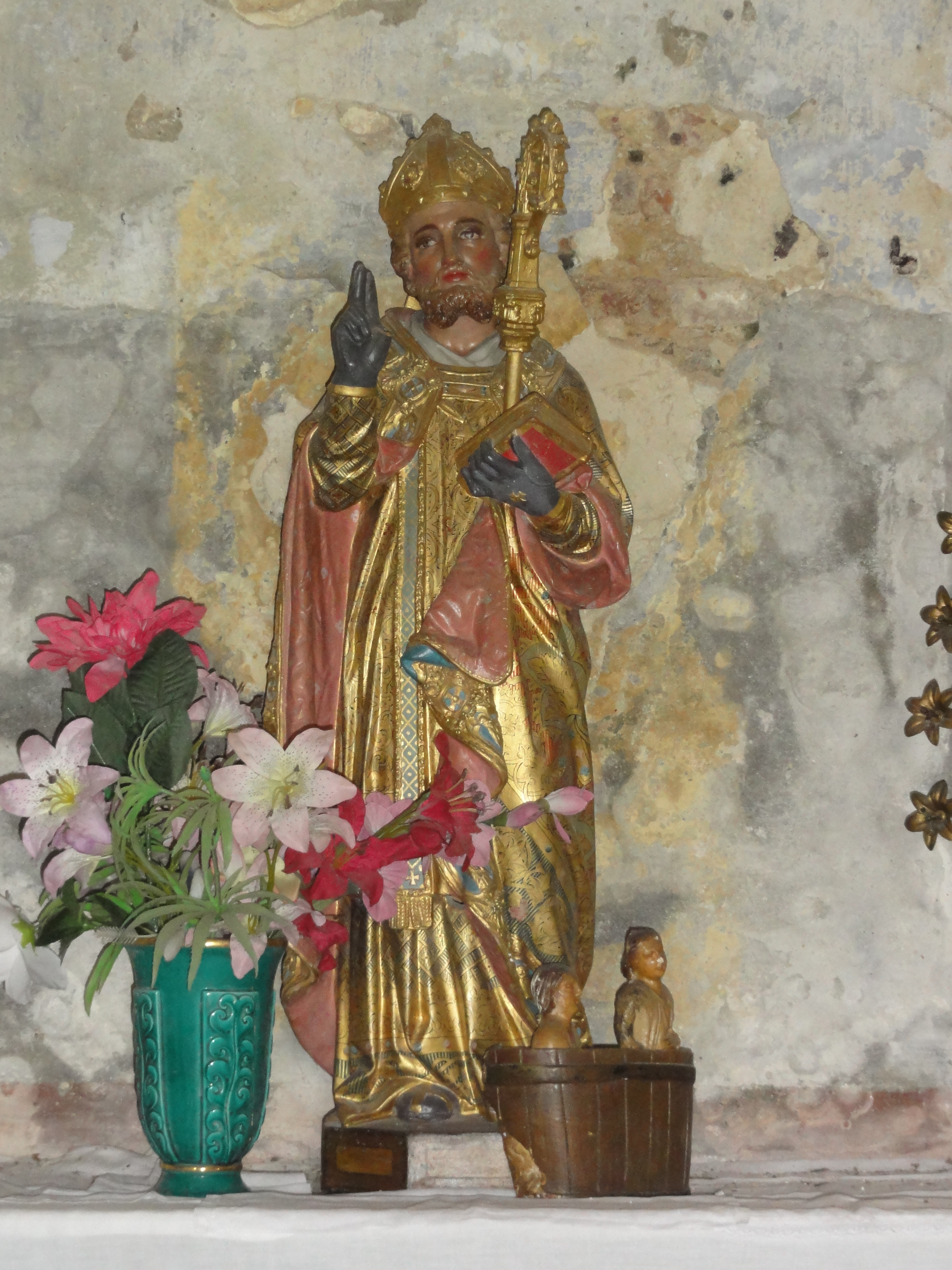
The Statue of Saint Nicolas in the church

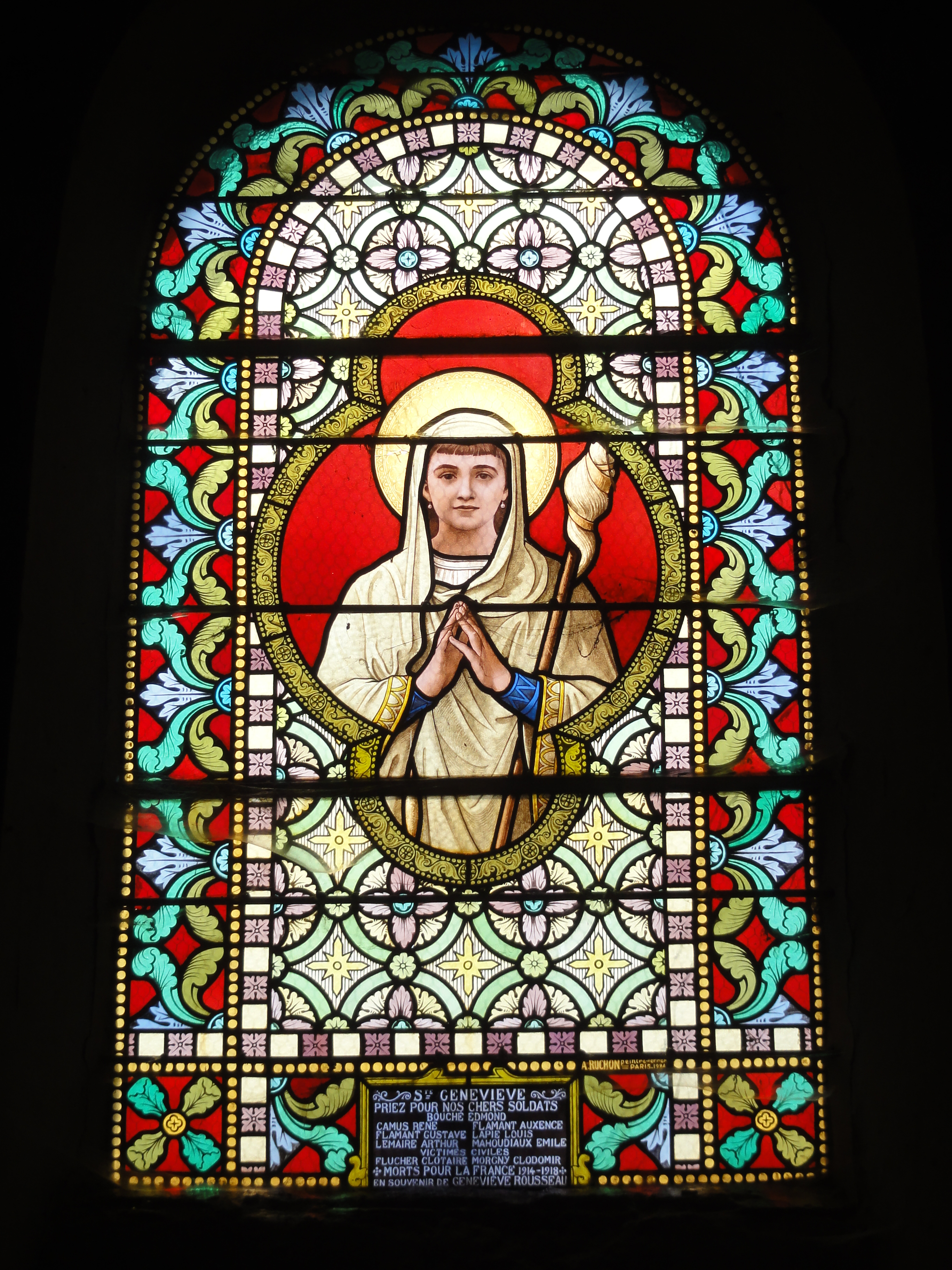
Stained glass window of Saint Genevieve

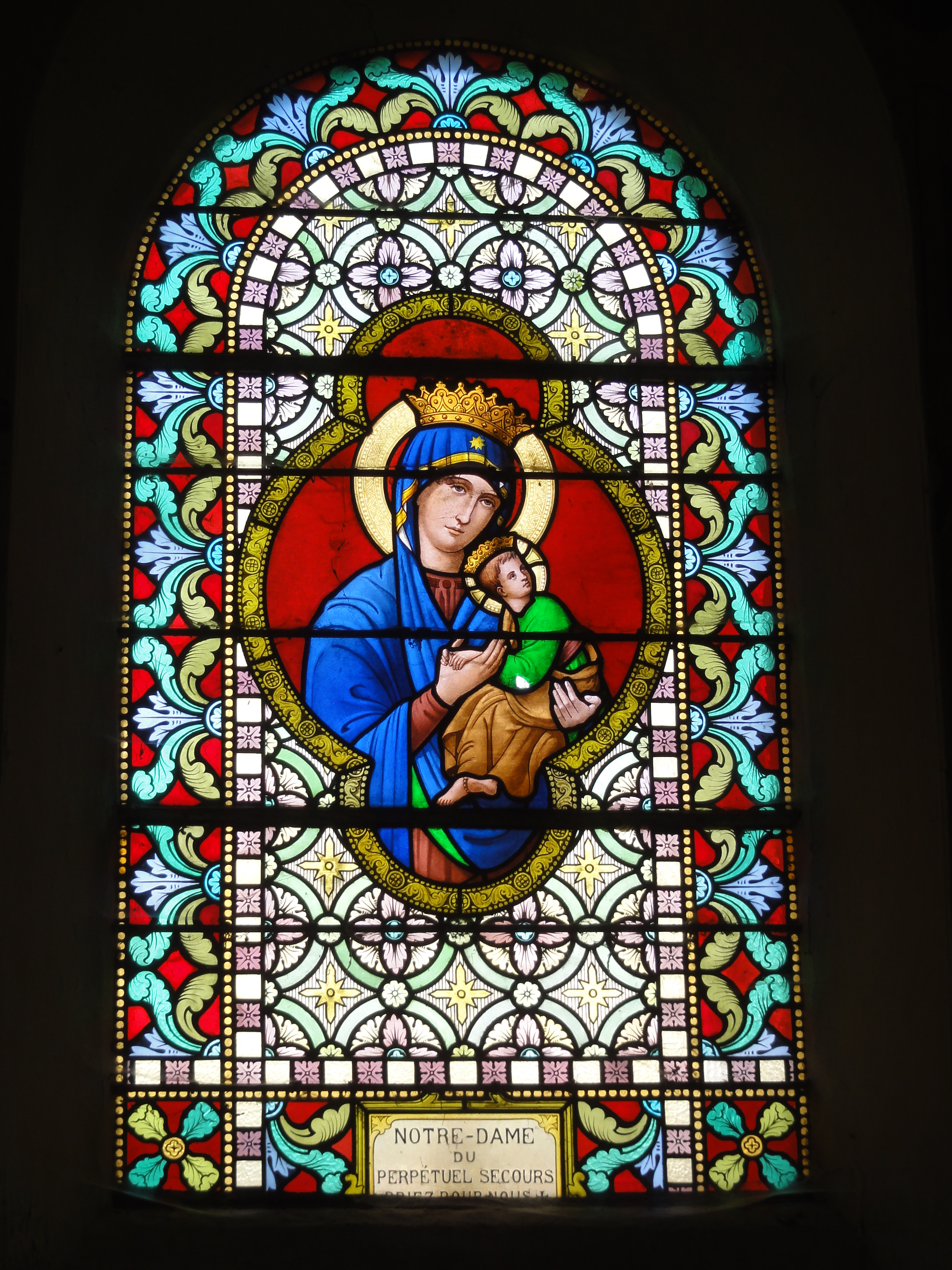
Stained glass window

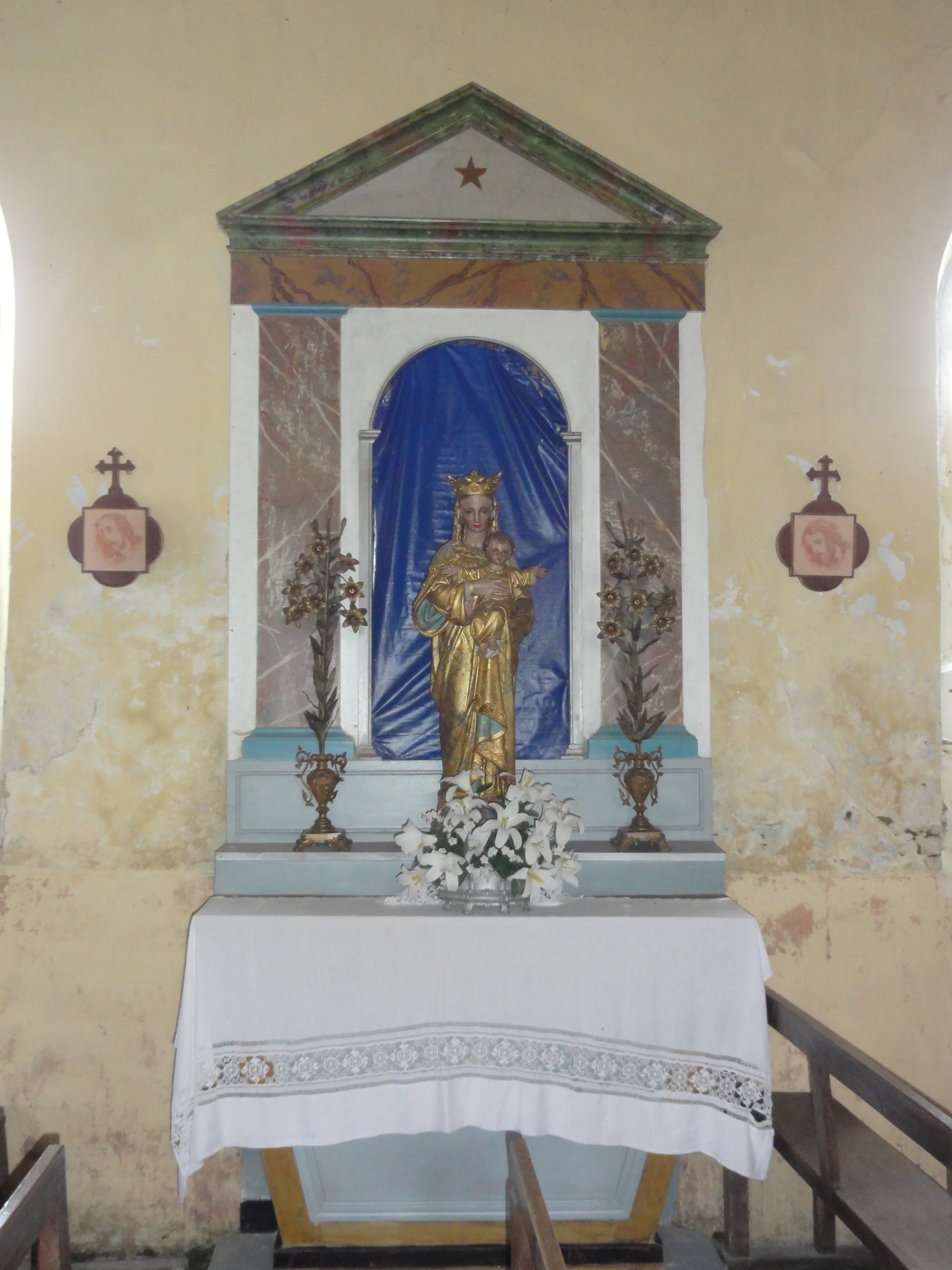
The Altar

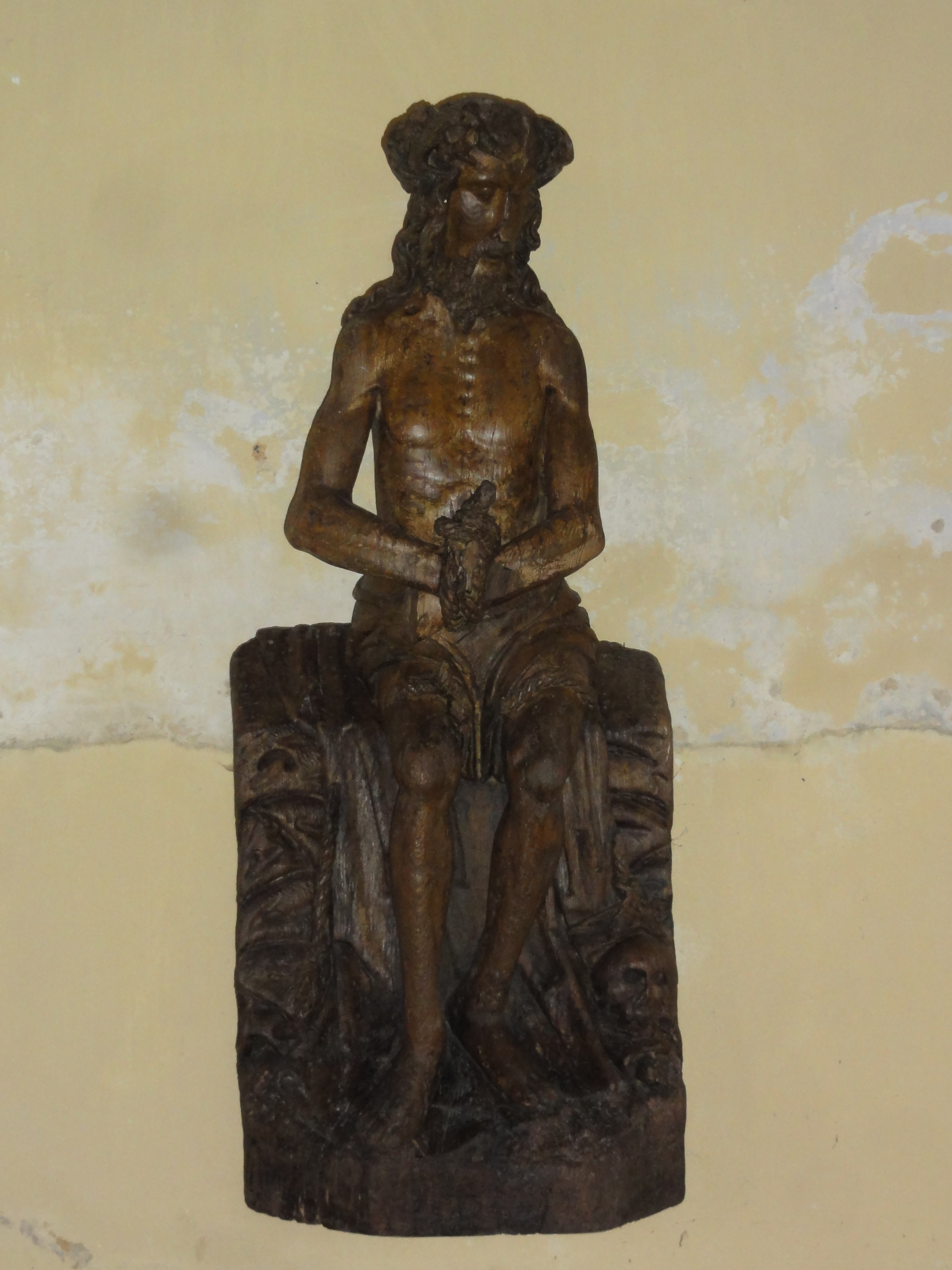
Statue of Christ in the church

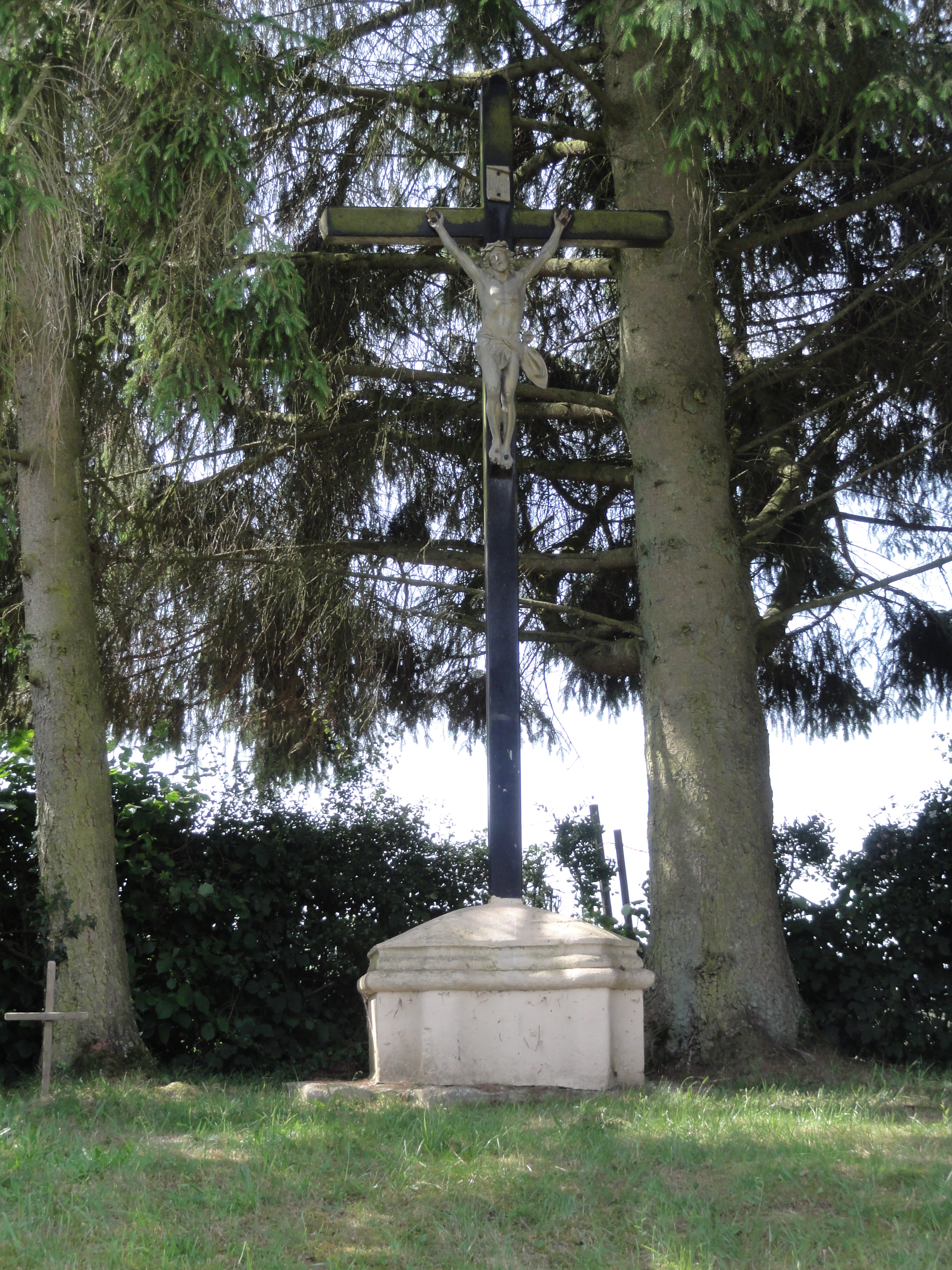
A Wayside Cross

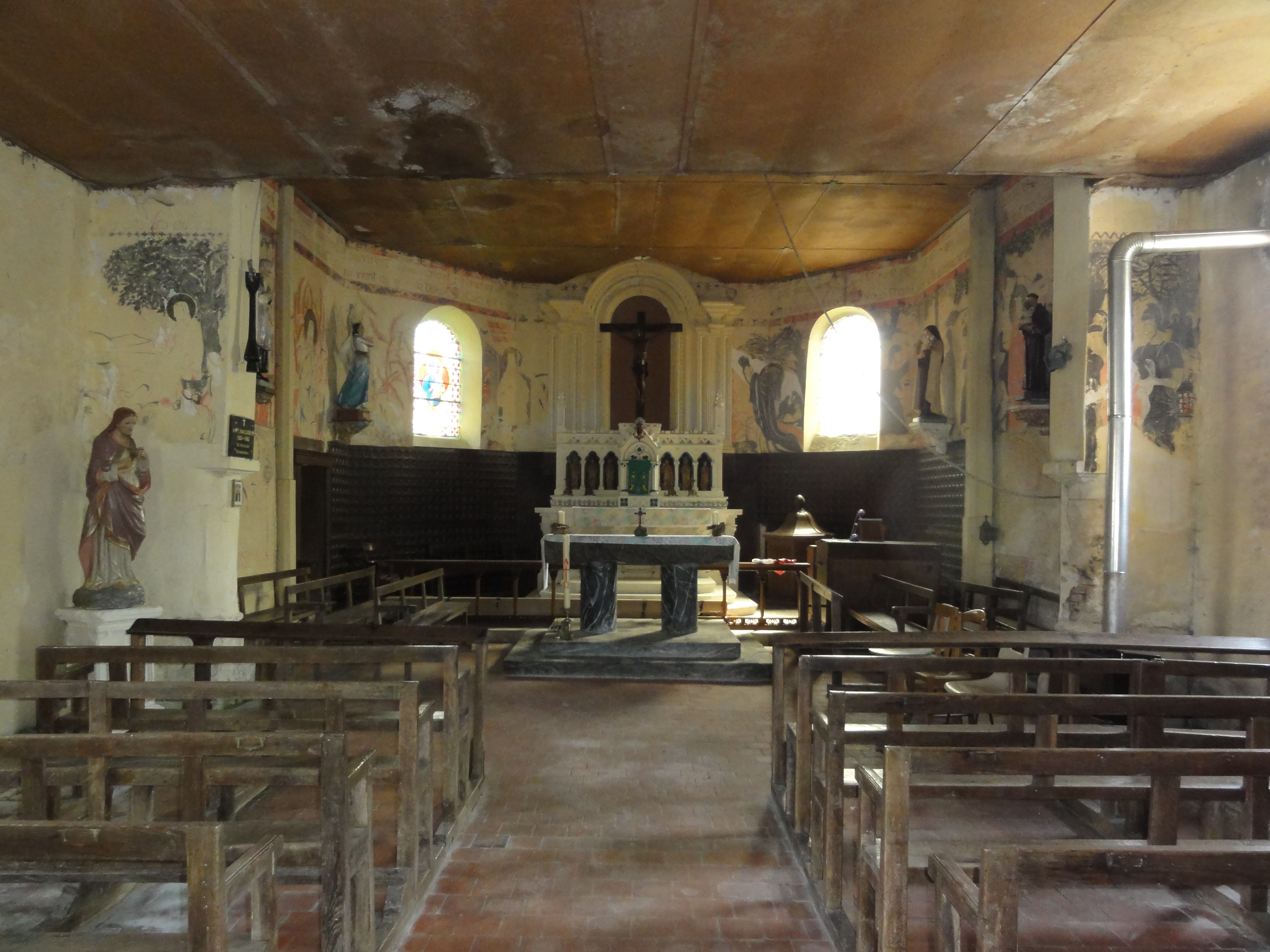
The Nave

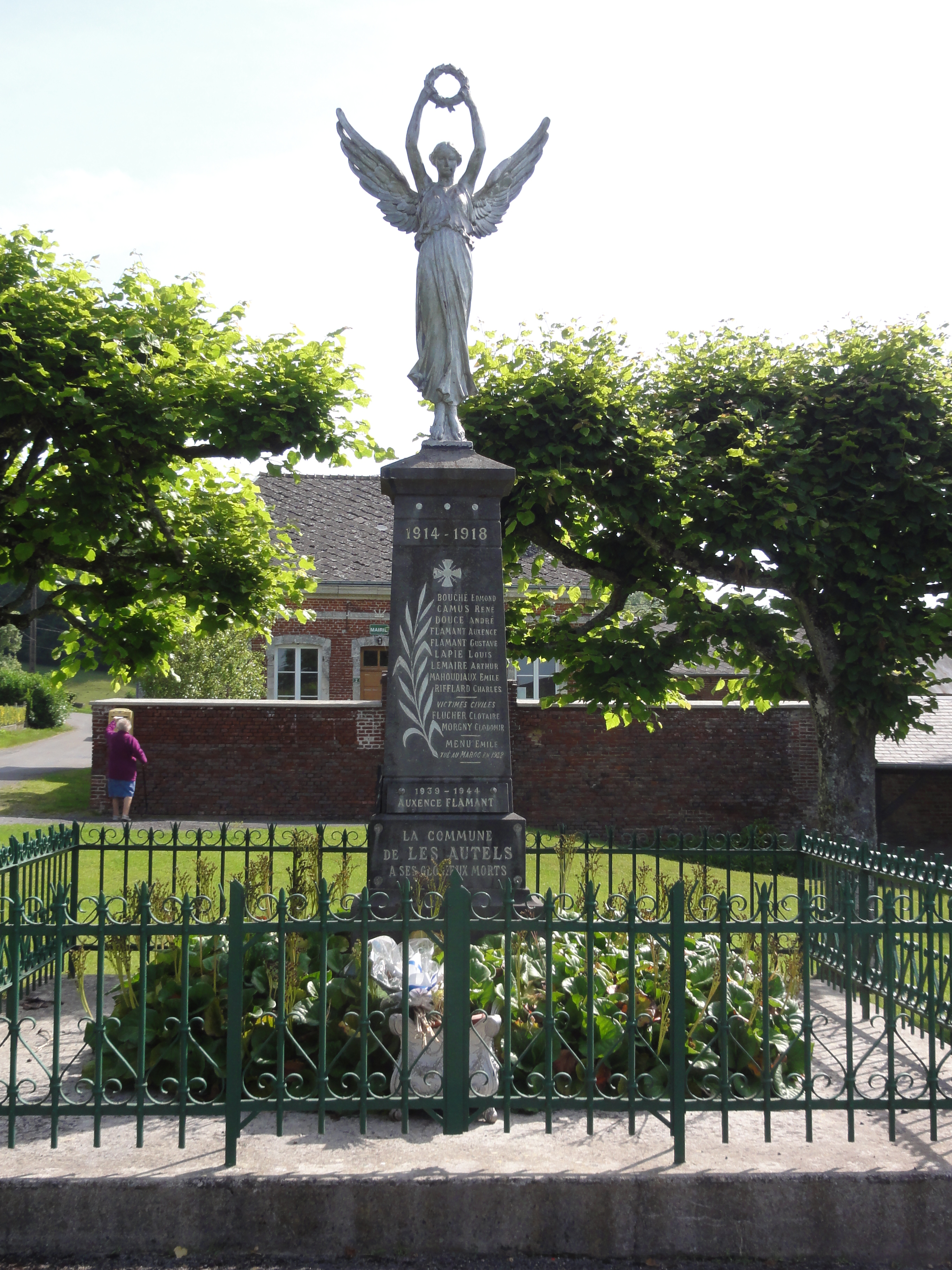
The War Memorial

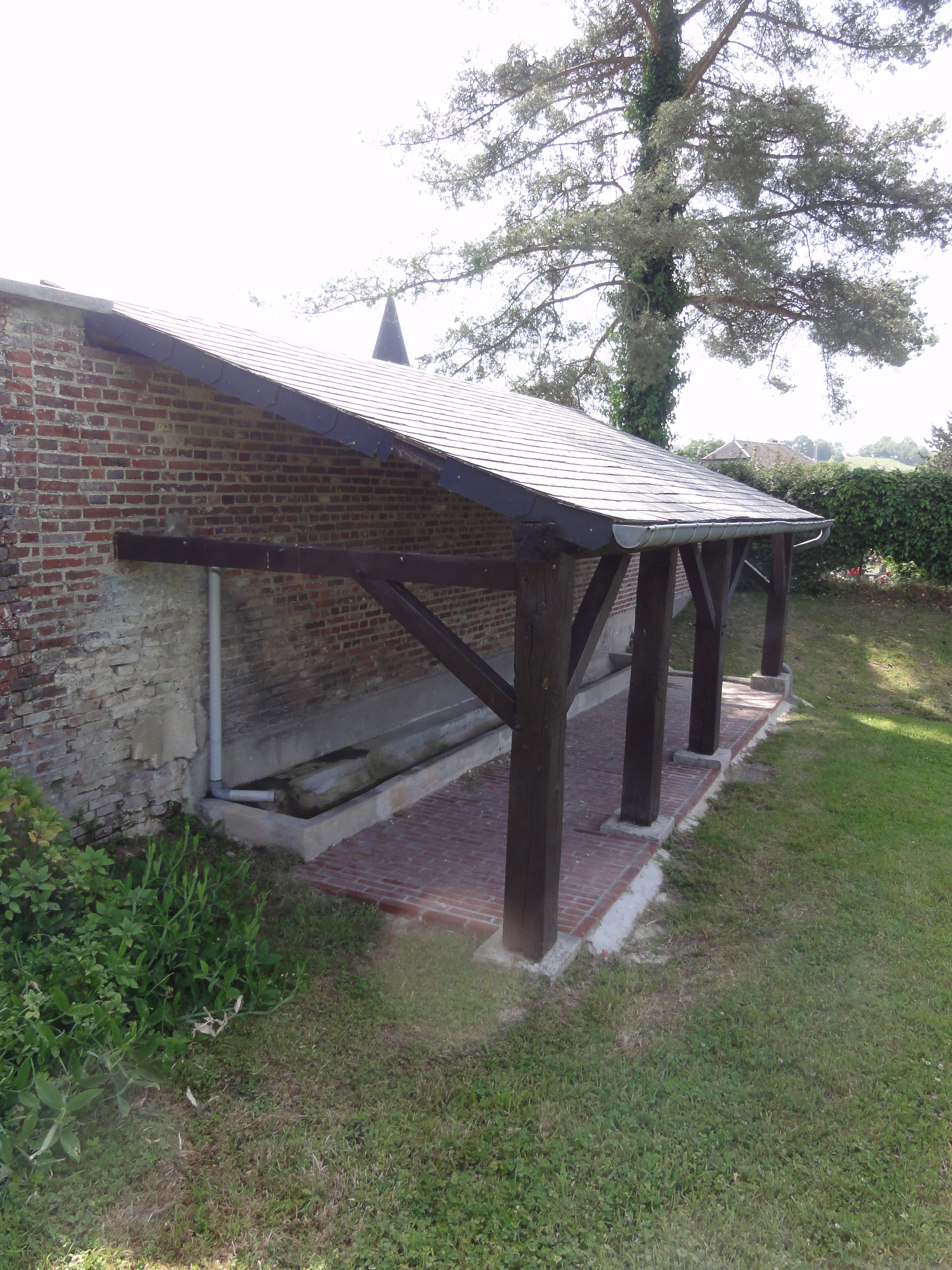
The Lavoir

== See also ==
- Communes of the Aisne department

=== External links ===
- Les Autels on the old IGN website (in French)
- Les Autels on Géoportail, National Geographic Institute (IGN) website (in French)
- Les Autels on the 1750 Cassini Map
