= Beaumé =

- Commune
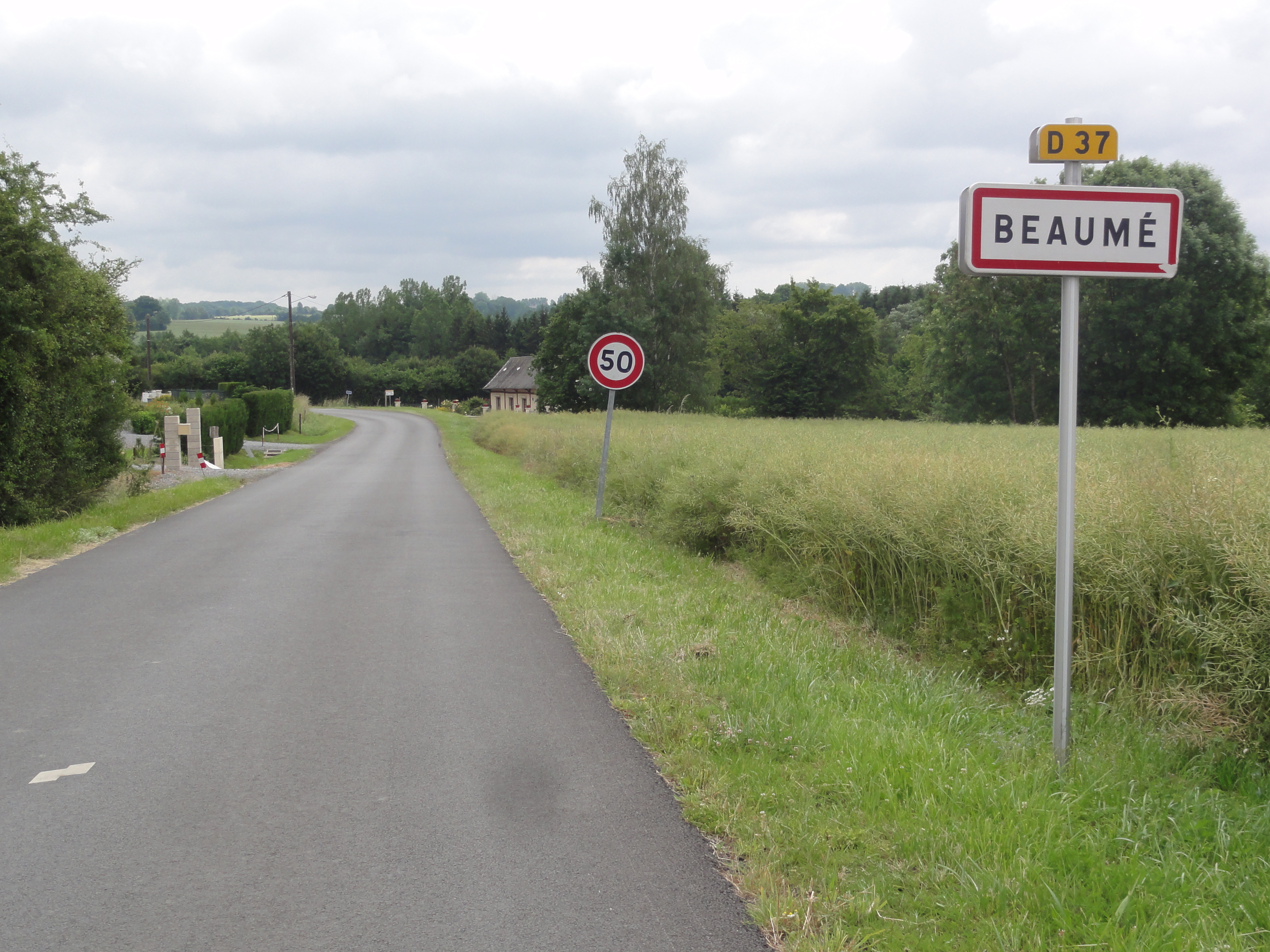
- Location of Beaumé
- Location within France Location within Hauts-de-France
- Coordinates: 49°50′20″N 4°09′11″E
- Country: France
- Region: Hauts-de-France
- Department: Aisne
- Arrondissement: Vervins
- Canton: Hirson
- Intercommunality: Trois Rivières

Government
  - Mayor (2026–32): Cindy Boquet-Boudjema
- Area^{1}: 9.18 km^{2} (3.54 sq mi)
- Elevation: 212 m (696 ft)
- Highest elevation: 254 m (833 ft)
- Lowest elevation: 168 m (551 ft)
- Population (2023): 82
  - Density: 8.9/km^{2} (23/sq mi)
- Time zone: UTC+01:00 (CET)
  - Summer (DST): UTC+02:00 (CEST)
- INSEE/Postal code: 02055 /02500
- ^{1} French Land Register data, which excludes lakes, ponds, glaciers > 1 km^{2} (0.386 sq mi or 247 acres) and river estuaries.

Beaumé (French pronunciation: [bome]) is a commune in the department of Aisne in the Hauts-de-France region of northern France.

== Geography ==
Beaumé is located some 70 km east of Saint-Quentin and 50 km west of Charleville-Mézières. It can be accessed by the D37 road from Besmont in the west passing through the commune and the village and continuing east to Aubenton. There are also several other country roads accessing the commune from all directions. Apart from the village there are two other hamlets: La Courte Soupe and Monplaisir. The south of the commune is heavily forested however most of the commune is farmland.

The Ruisseau de l'Etang Polliart flows from the southeast of the commune to the north with several tributaries as it continues north out of the commune to join the Ton river at Leuze.

== Population ==
Historical population
Year	Pop.	±% p.a.
1968	145	—
1975	112	−3.62%
1982	123	+1.35%
1990	113	−1.05%
1999	118	+0.48%
2007	100	−2.05%
2012	98	−0.40%
2017	92	−1.26%
2023	82	−1.90%
Source: INSEE

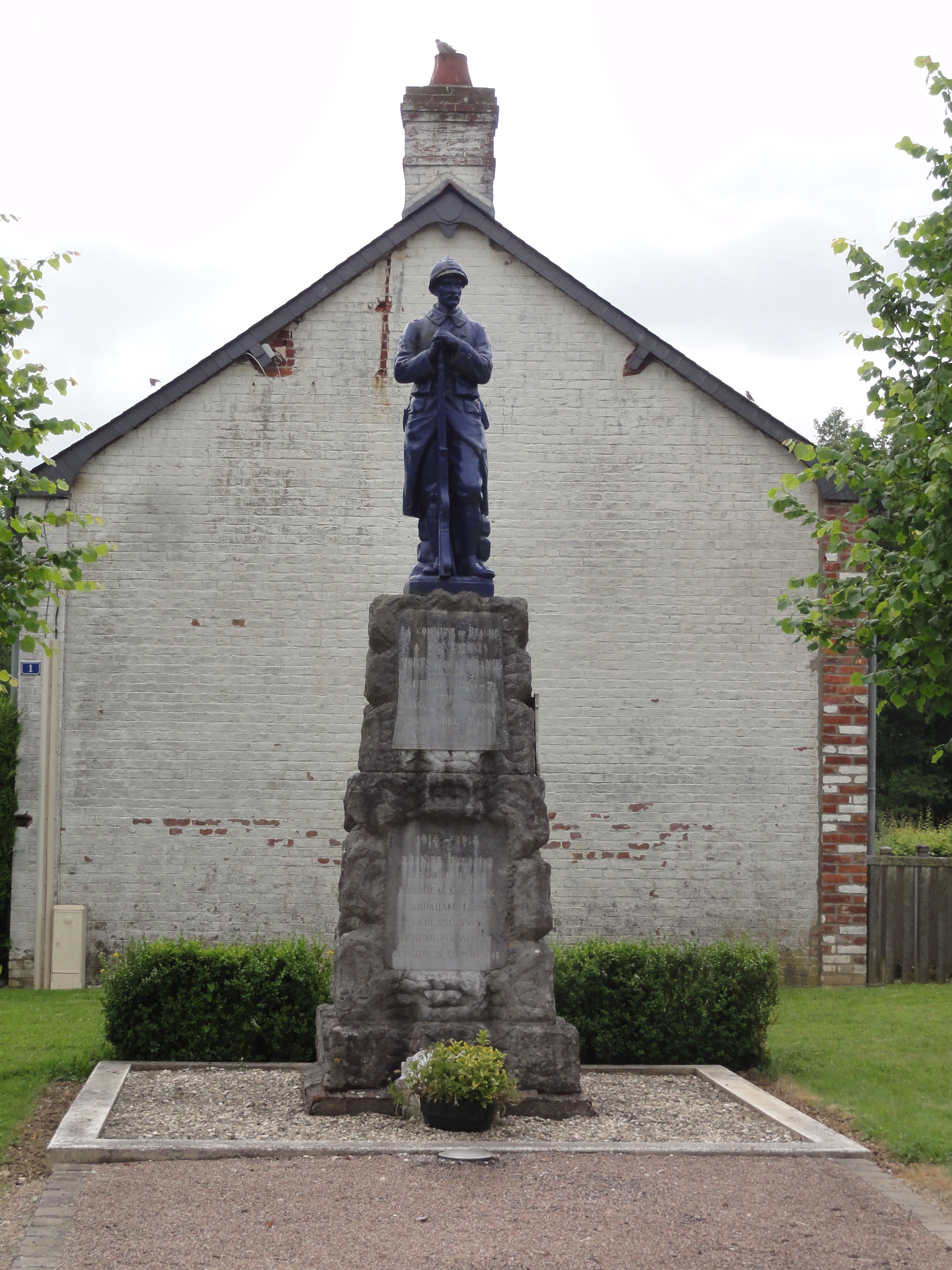
The War Memorial

== Culture and heritage ==
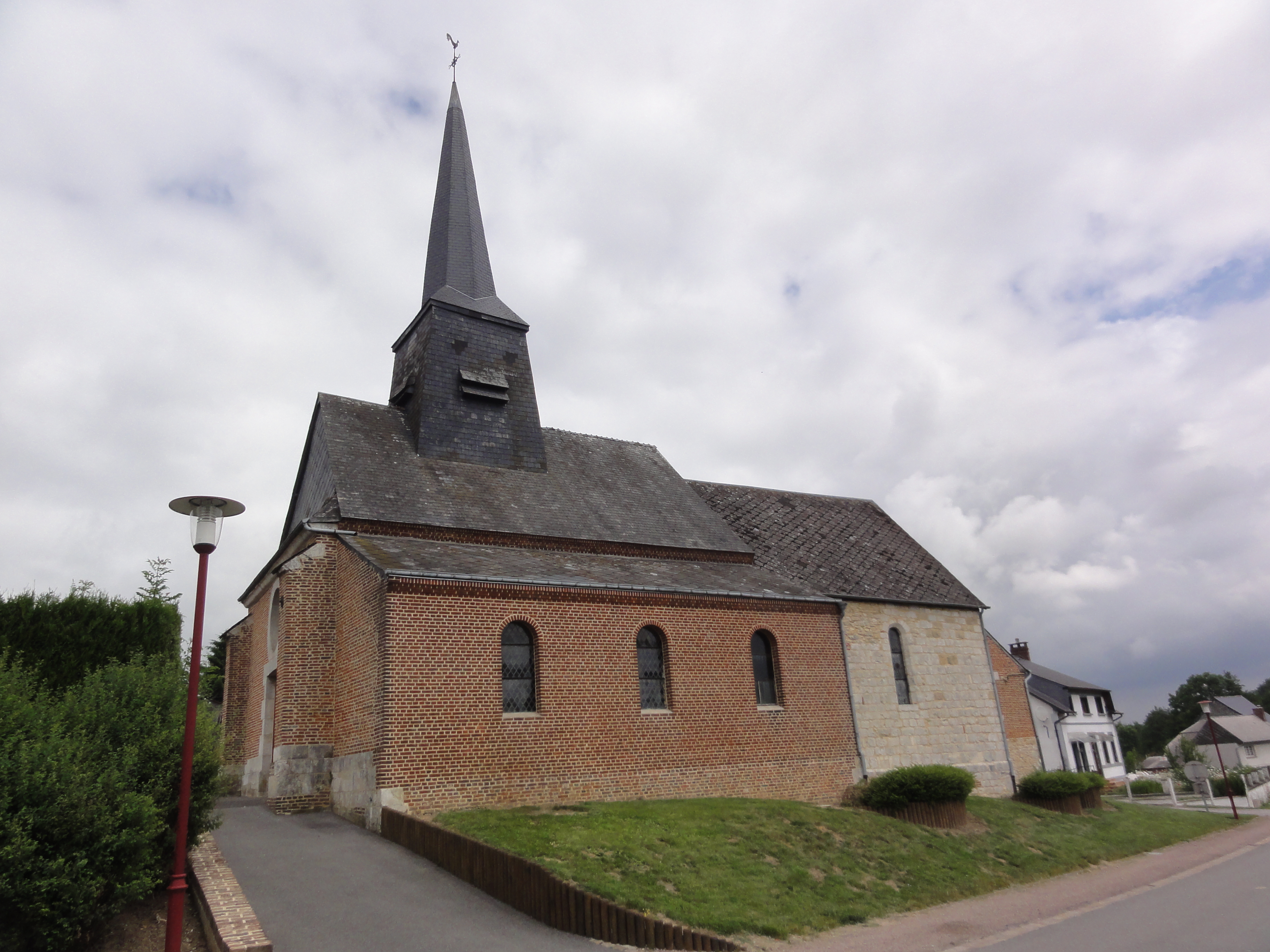
The Church of Saint Nicolas

=== Civil heritage ===
The commune has a number of buildings and structures that are registered as historical monuments:

- A Farmhouse at 6 Rue de l'Eglise (1849)
- A Farmhouse at La Courte Soupe d'en bas (18th century)
- An old Chateau at 4-12 Rue de Leuze (1772)
- The Town Hall / School at 2 Place de la Mairie (1843)
- The old Grange-aux-Bois Manor at Grange-aux-Bois (1870)

=== Religious heritage ===
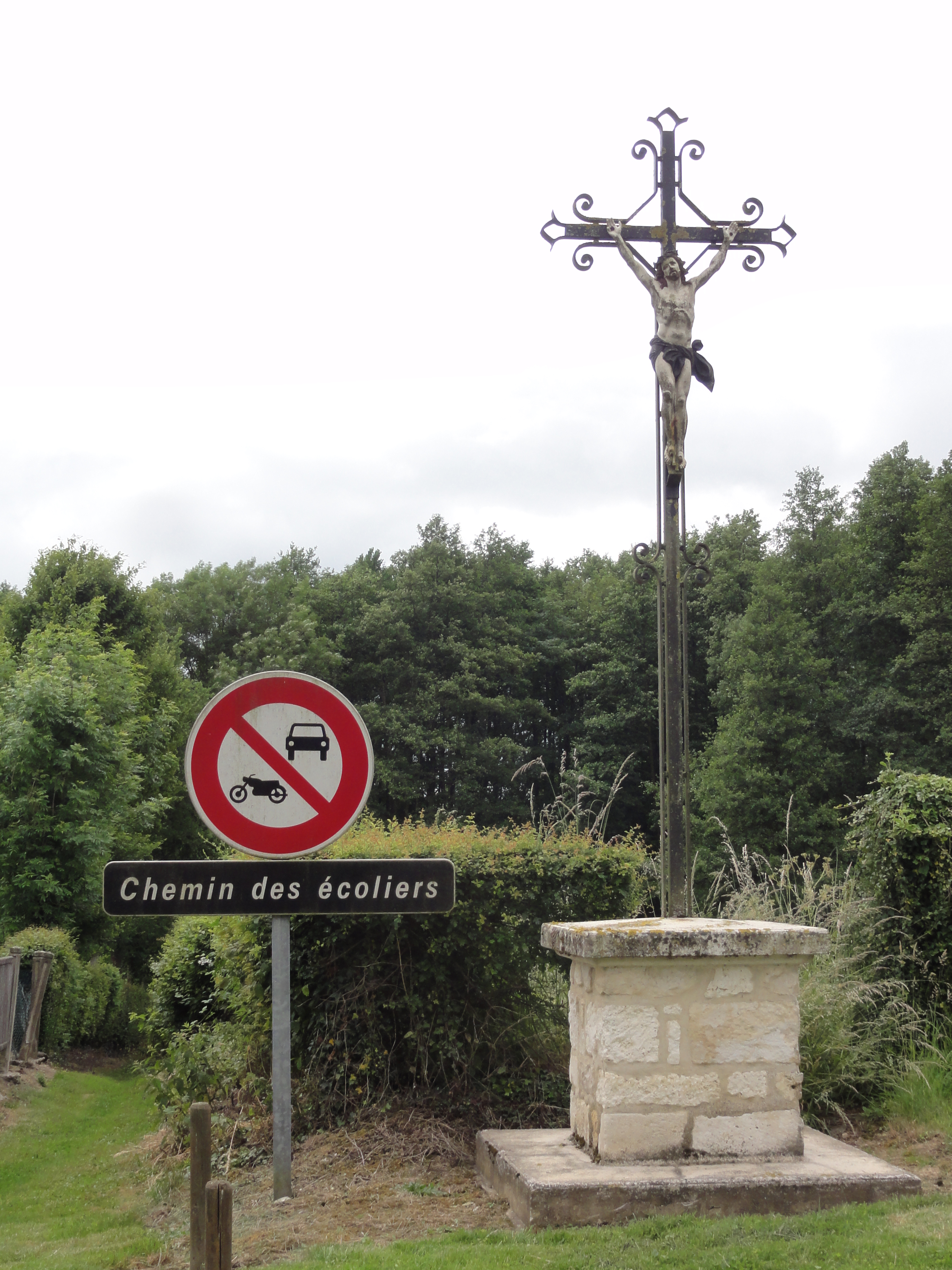
A Wayside Cross

The commune has several religious buildings and structures that are registered as historical monuments:

- The Bordreaux-Grimpret Family Tomb (1882)
- The Tomb of Hippolite Licent (1858)
- The Tomb of Infantry Captain Pierre Antoine Menu (1844)
- The Parish Church and Cemetery of Saint Nicolas (14th century)

The Church contains many items that are registered as historical objects:

- A Paten (19th century)
- A Book: Missale Ecclesiae Laudensis (1773)
- A Chalice (19th century)
- A Stoup (18th century)
- A Stained glass window: Our Lady of Victories (19th century)
- The Charlotte Bell (1783)
- An Altar Painting: Christ on the Cross (1969)
- A Baptismal font (16th century)
- The "Queen's Chair" (18th century)
- A Statue: Saint Nicolas (16th century)
- A set of 4 Church Lamps (19th century)
- A Wardrobe converted to a Confessional (19th century)
- The Furniture in the Church
- The Furniture in the Church (Supplementary list)
- A Book: Book of Common Prayer and particular Masses of Saint Benedict (1619)
- A set of 5 Pews (17th century)
- The Panelling in the semi-recess of the Choir (18th century)
- The Retable on the main Altar (18th century)
- The Tabernacle on the main Altar (18th century)
- The main Altar (18th century)
- The whole of the decoration of the Choir (17th century)
- A Stool for a Choir child (18th century)
- A Bronze Bell (1783)

== Notable People linked to the commune ==
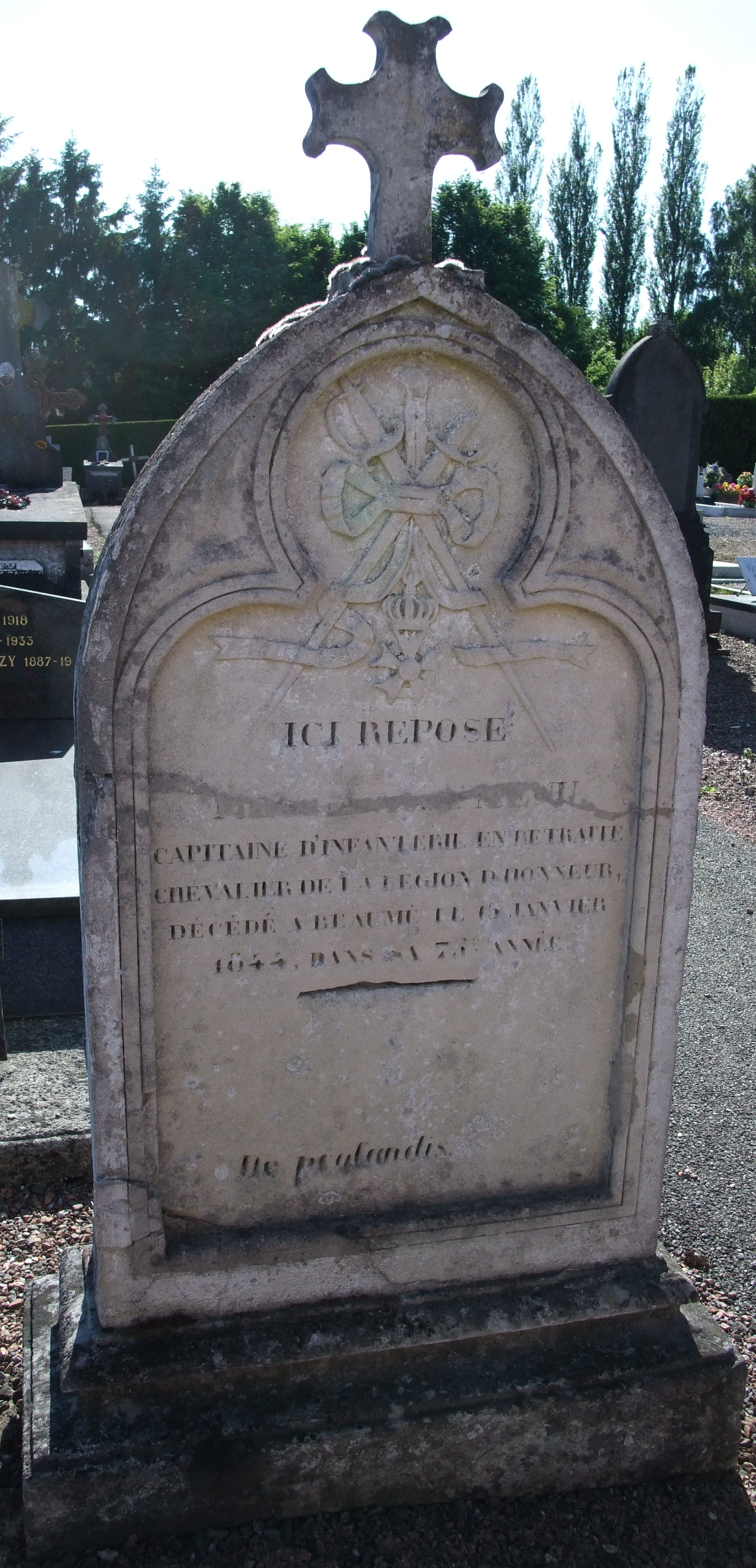
Grave of Pierre Antoine Menu (1769-1844)

- Pierre Antoine Menu, Captain of the 84th regiment of infantry of the line, Chevalier of the Legion of Honour, native of Archon. Buried at Beaumé.

== See also ==
- Communes of the Aisne department
