= Leuze =

Leuze may refer to several places:

- Leuze-en-Hainaut, in the province of Hainaut, Belgium
- Leuze, a village in the municipality of Éghezée, Namur province, Belgium
- Leuze, Aisne, in the department of Aisne, France

== Other uses ==
- Battle of Leuze, took place on 18 September 1691
