= Hannappes =

- Commune
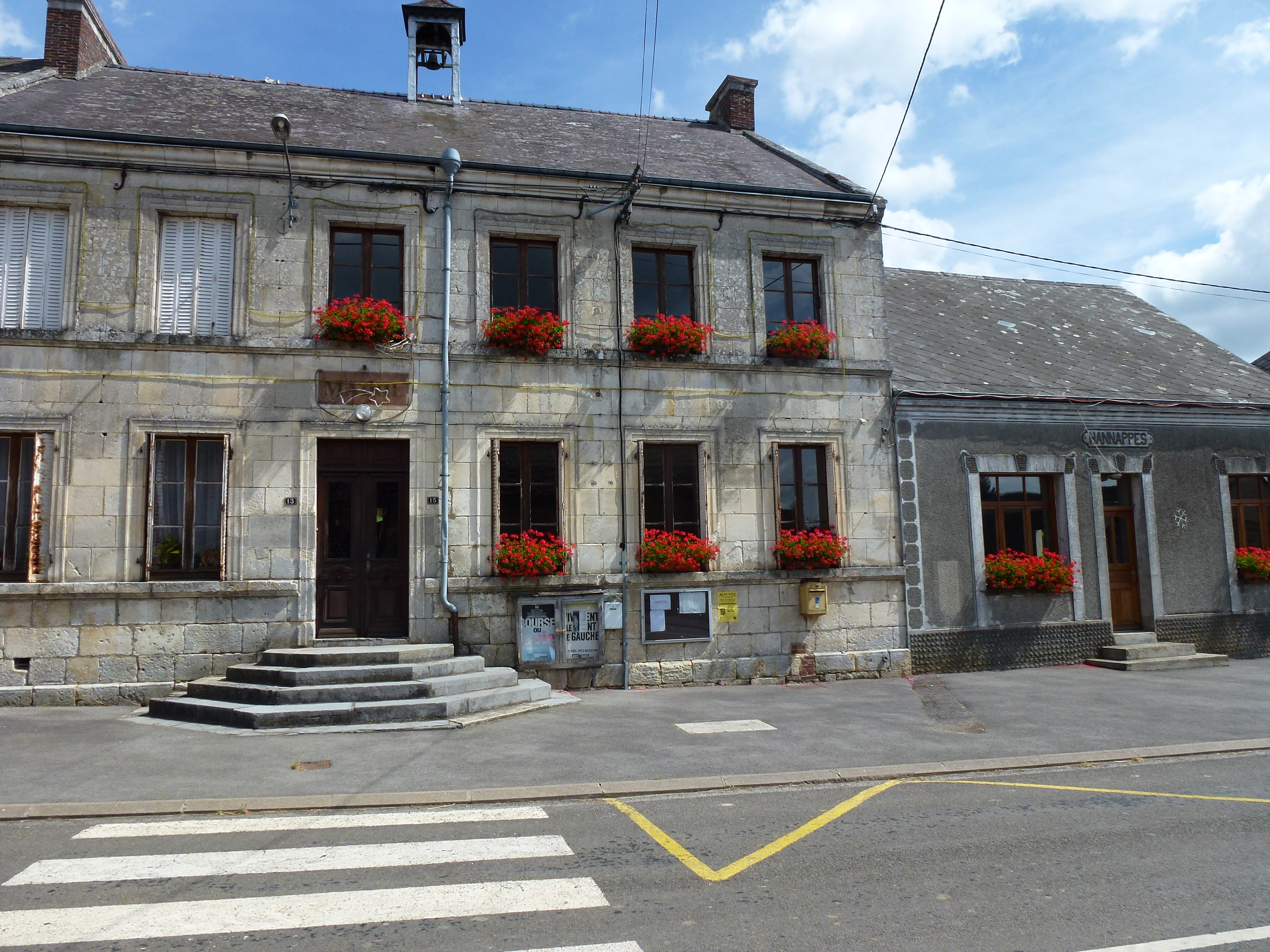
- Town hall
- Location of Hannappes
- Location within France Location within Grand Est
- Coordinates: 49°49′30″N 4°13′53″E
- Country: France
- Region: Grand Est
- Department: Ardennes
- Arrondissement: Charleville-Mézières
- Canton: Signy-l'Abbaye

Government
  - Mayor (2020–2026): Philippe Champion
- Area^{1}: 8.45 km^{2} (3.26 sq mi)
- Elevation: 185 m (607 ft)
- Highest elevation: 238 m (781 ft)
- Lowest elevation: 177 m (581 ft)
- Population (2023): 136
  - Density: 16.1/km^{2} (41.7/sq mi)
- Time zone: UTC+01:00 (CET)
  - Summer (DST): UTC+02:00 (CEST)
- INSEE/Postal code: 08208 /08290
- ^{1} French Land Register data, which excludes lakes, ponds, glaciers > 1 km^{2} (0.386 sq mi or 247 acres) and river estuaries.

Hannappes (French pronunciation: [anap]) is a commune in the Ardennes department in northern France.

== Population ==
Historical population
Year	Pop.	±% p.a.
1968	219	—
1975	210	−0.60%
1982	211	+0.07%
1990	186	−1.56%
1999	155	−2.01%
2007	158	+0.24%
2012	153	−0.64%
2017	141	−1.62%
2023	136	−0.60%
Source: INSEE

== See also ==
- Communes of the Ardennes department
