= Brunehamel =

- Commune
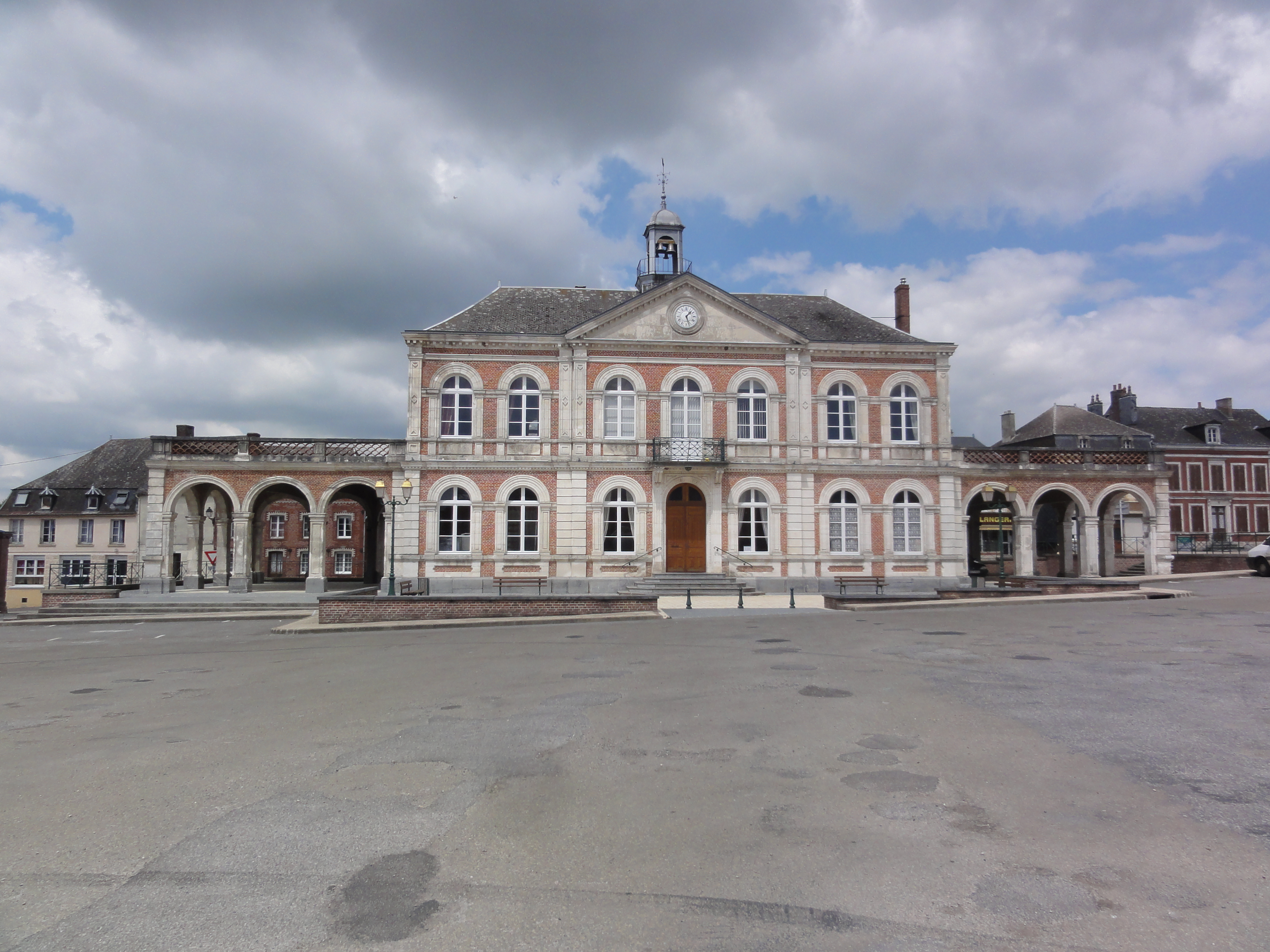
- The town hall of Brunehamel
- Location of Brunehamel
- Location within France Location within Hauts-de-France
- Coordinates: 49°46′14″N 4°10′58″E
- Country: France
- Region: Hauts-de-France
- Department: Aisne
- Arrondissement: Vervins
- Canton: Vervins
- Intercommunality: Portes de la Thiérache

Government
  - Mayor (2026–32): Alexandre Bienfait
- Area^{1}: 8.9 km^{2} (3.4 sq mi)
- Elevation: 256 m (840 ft)
- Highest elevation: 261 m (856 ft)
- Lowest elevation: 198 m (650 ft)
- Population (2023): 463
  - Density: 52/km^{2} (130/sq mi)
- Time zone: UTC+01:00 (CET)
  - Summer (DST): UTC+02:00 (CEST)
- INSEE/Postal code: 02126 /02360
- ^{1} French Land Register data, which excludes lakes, ponds, glaciers > 1 km^{2} (0.386 sq mi or 247 acres) and river estuaries.

Brunehamel is a commune in the department of Aisne in Hauts-de-France in northern France.

== Géography ==
Brunehamel is in the northeast of Aisne, 5 km (3.1 mi) from Ardennes and 30 km (19 mi) from the department of Nord. It is between Hirson and Vervins.

== Population ==
Historical population
Year	Pop.	±% p.a.
1968	636	—
1975	592	−1.02%
1982	652	+1.39%
1990	508	−3.07%
1999	511	+0.07%
2007	539	+0.67%
2012	522	−0.64%
2017	456	−2.67%
2023	463	+0.25%
Source: INSEE

== See also ==
- Communes of the Aisne department
