= Thon (river) =

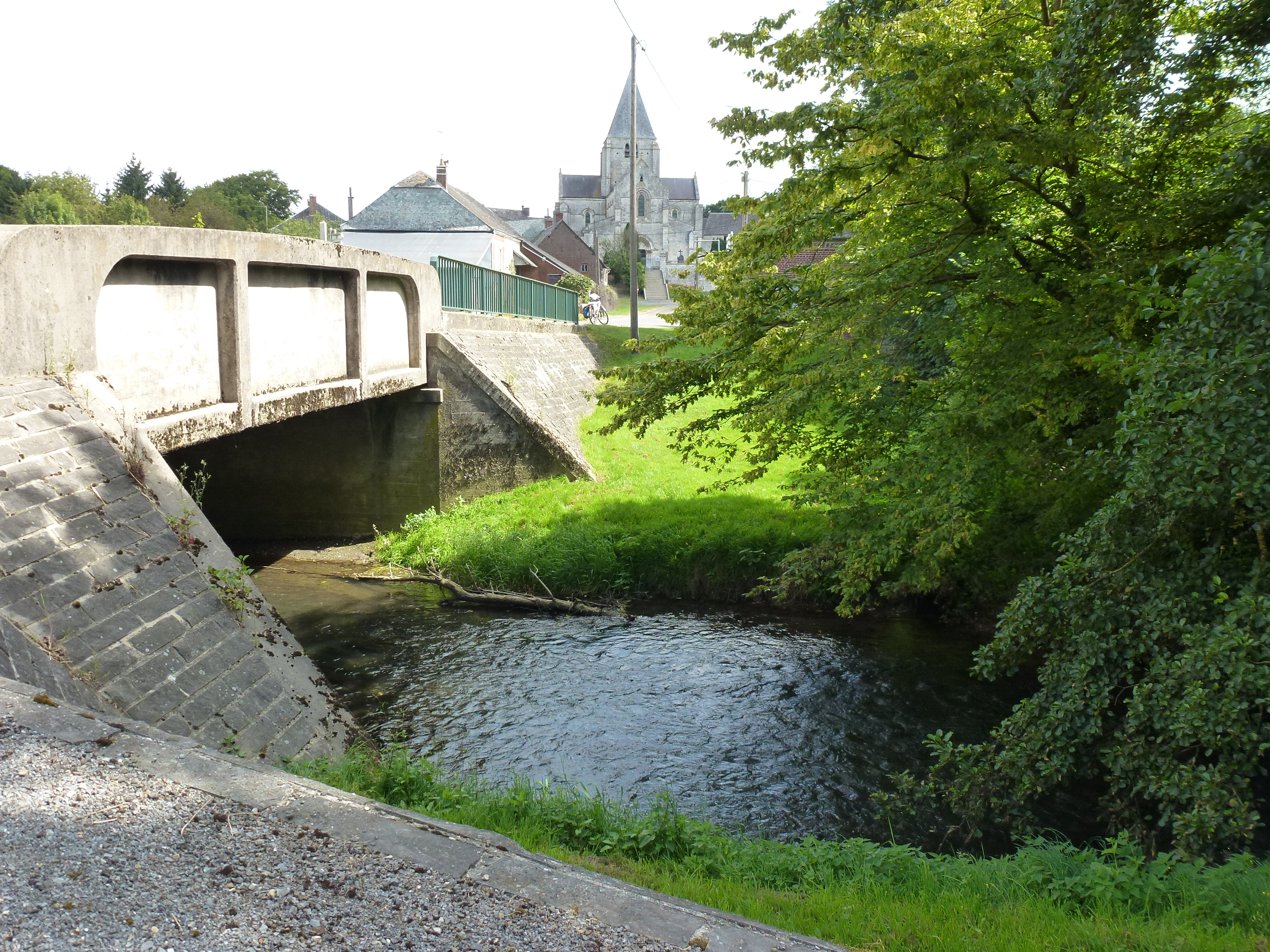

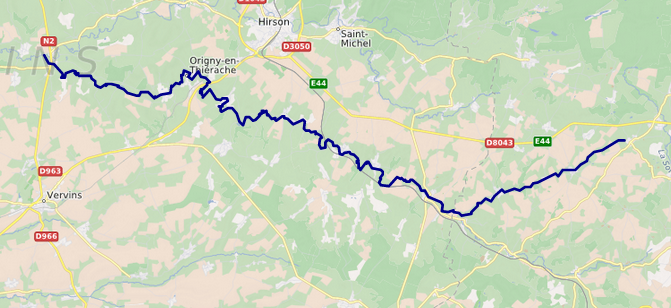

Location
- Country: France

Physical characteristics
- Source
  - elevation: 273 m (896 ft)
- Mouth
  - location: Oise
  - coordinates: 49.9055°N 3.9084°E
- Length: 56.3 km (35.0 mi)

Basin features
- Progression: Oise→ Seine→ English Channel

The Thon or Ton is a small river in northern France. It is a tributary of the river Oise, which flows into the Seine. It crosses the Ardennes and Aisne departments and is the central river of the Thiérache.
