= Leuze, Aisne =

Leuze
- Commune
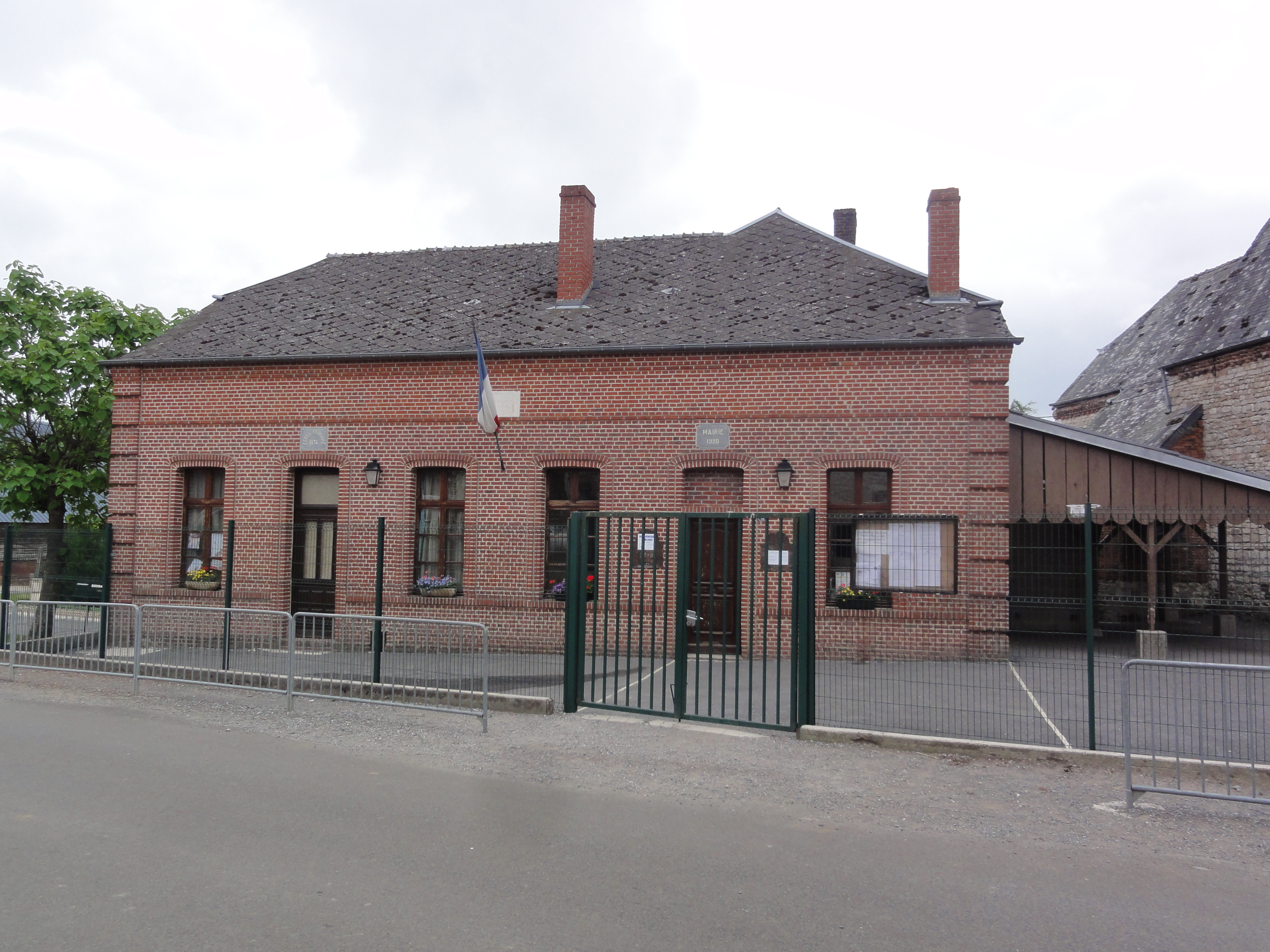
- The town hall and school of Leuze
- Location of Leuze
- Location within France Location within Hauts-de-France
- Coordinates: 49°51′08″N 4°09′45″E
- Country: France
- Region: Hauts-de-France
- Department: Aisne
- Arrondissement: Vervins
- Canton: Hirson
- Intercommunality: CC Trois Rivières

Government
  - Mayor (2026–32): Guy Bonnaire
- Area^{1}: 10.19 km^{2} (3.93 sq mi)
- Elevation: 175 m (574 ft)
- Highest elevation: 226 m (741 ft)
- Lowest elevation: 163 m (535 ft)
- Population (2023): 190
  - Density: 19/km^{2} (48/sq mi)
- Time zone: UTC+01:00 (CET)
  - Summer (DST): UTC+02:00 (CEST)
- INSEE/Postal code: 02425 /02500
- ^{1} French Land Register data, which excludes lakes, ponds, glaciers > 1 km^{2} (0.386 sq mi or 247 acres) and river estuaries.

Leuze (French pronunciation: [løz]) is a commune in the Aisne department in Hauts-de-France in northern France.

== Population ==
Historical population
Year	Pop.	±% p.a.
1968	214	—
1975	173	−2.99%
1982	165	−0.67%
1990	173	+0.59%
1999	171	−0.13%
2007	158	−0.98%
2012	167	+1.11%
2017	173	+0.71%
2023	190	+1.57%
Source: INSEE

== See also ==
- Communes of the Aisne department
