= Haute Colme Canal =

Canal in northern France

Coordinates: 50°50′N 2°12′E

Canal de la Haute Colme
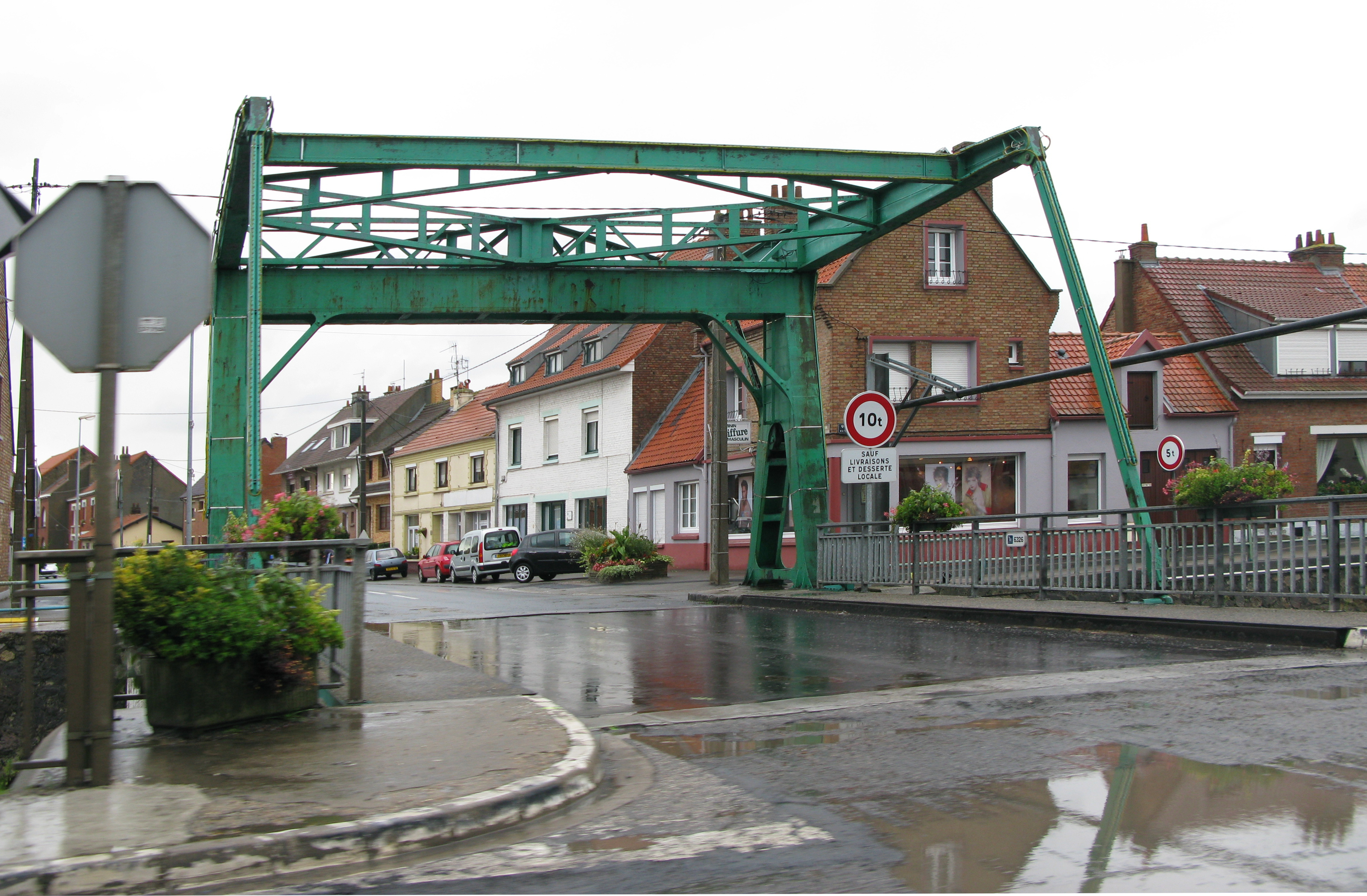
- Drawbridge in Grand-Millebrugghe.

Specifications
- Length: 25 km (16 mi)
- Locks: 3 (including 1 out of service)
- Status: In service.

History
- Date of first use: 1753

Geography
- Direction: East-West
- Start point: Aa in Watten
- End point: Canal de Bergues in Bergues
- Branch of: Canal de la Colme

The Canal de la Haute Colme is a canal in northern France. The haute (English: high) Colme corresponds to the western segment of the Canal de la Colme. The channel connects the river Aa at Watten to Canal de Bergues and Canal de la Basse Colme at Bergues. Between Watten and Cappelle-Brouck, it is part of the Canal Dunkerque-Escaut.

== See also ==
- List of canals in France
