= Augustin Honnorez =

Banker and contractor (1770–1840)

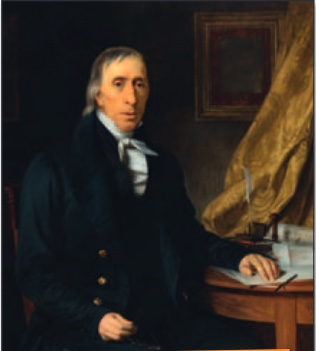

Augustin Honnorez (1770–1840) was a banker and contractor of Mons and had a major interest in water way projects.

He designed and directed the work on the Canal de la Sensée, beginning in June 1819 and completing it in 1820. Besides the widening of the Canal de la Sensée, he also implemented several locks, one on the Scheldt and two others on the Scarpe, and the draining of the marshes l'Agache, the l’Hirondelle and the Sensée. He worked on the Canal de Saint-Quentin from 1827 to 1849.

He engineered the construction of the Mons-Condé Canal from 1800 to 1818.
