= Billy-Berclau =

- Commune
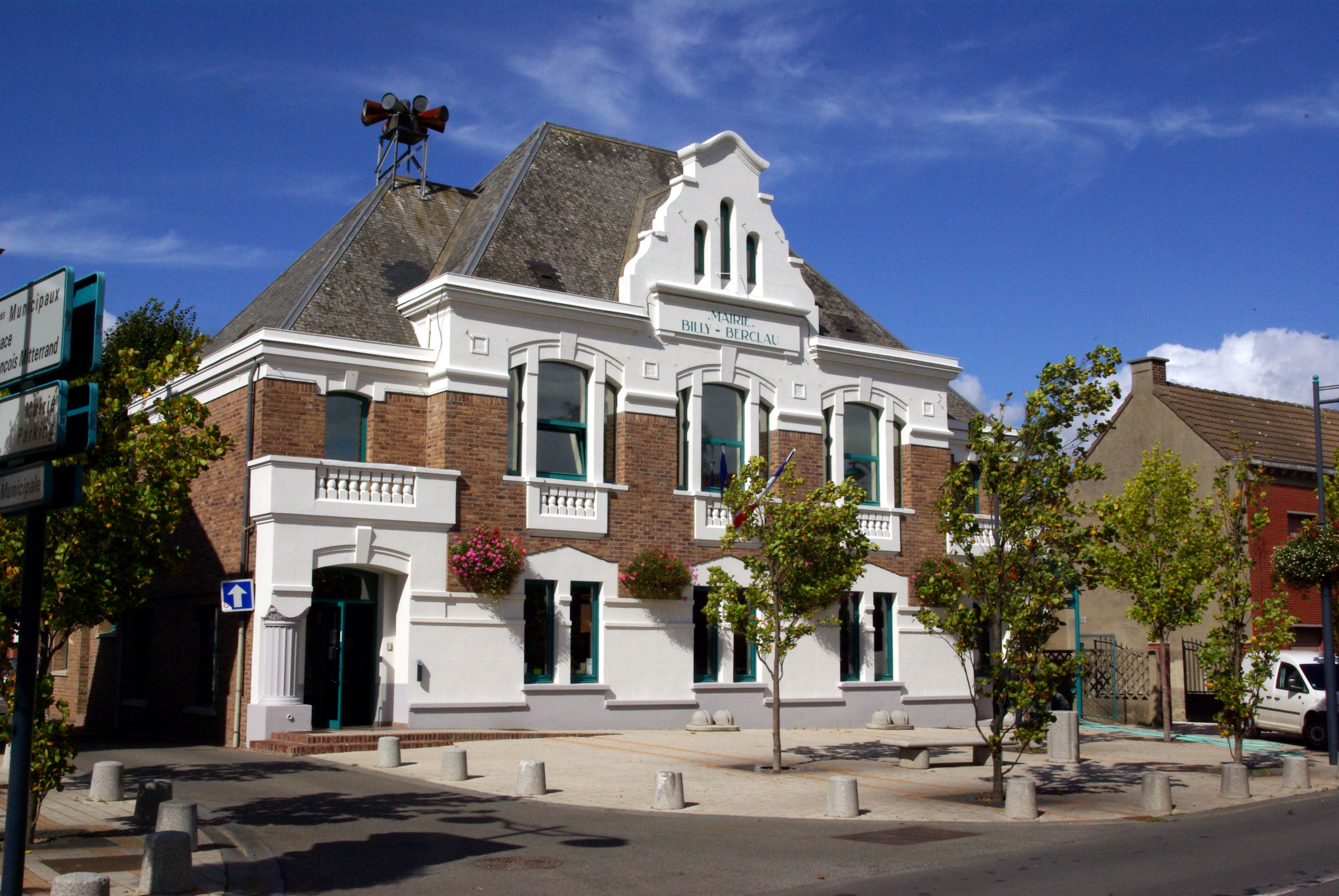
- The town hall of Billy-Berclau

- Coat of arms
- Location of Billy-Berclau
- Location within France Location within Hauts-de-France
- Coordinates: 50°31′11″N 2°52′06″E
- Country: France
- Region: Hauts-de-France
- Department: Pas-de-Calais
- Arrondissement: Béthune
- Canton: Douvrin
- Intercommunality: CA Béthune-Bruay, Artois-Lys Romane

Government
  - Mayor (2020–2026): Stève Bossart
- Area^{1}: 7.41 km^{2} (2.86 sq mi)
- Elevation: 24 m (79 ft)
- Highest elevation: 27 m (89 ft)
- Lowest elevation: 17 m (56 ft)
- Population (2023): 5,093
  - Density: 687/km^{2} (1,780/sq mi)
- Time zone: UTC+01:00 (CET)
  - Summer (DST): UTC+02:00 (CEST)
- INSEE/Postal code: 62132 /62138
- ^{1} French Land Register data, which excludes lakes, ponds, glaciers > 1 km^{2} (0.386 sq mi or 247 acres) and river estuaries.

Billy-Berclau (French pronunciation: [bili bɛʁklo]; Picard: Bili-Bérclo) is a commune in the Pas-de-Calais department in the Hauts-de-France region in northern France.

== Geography ==
A small town 10 miles (16 km) east of Béthune and 12 miles (19 km) southwest of Lille, at the junction of the D163 and N47 roads. It is situated at the junction of the Canal de la Deûle and the Canal d'Aire. Light industry and a little farming have replaced the coal mining of the past.

== History ==
The town was completely destroyed during World War I. On 27 March 2003, an explosion at the dynamite factory killed four people.

== Population ==
Historical population
Year	Pop.	±% p.a.
1968	2,979	—
1975	3,164	+0.86%
1982	3,579	+1.78%
1990	4,149	+1.86%
1999	4,259	+0.29%
2007	4,280	+0.06%
2012	4,478	+0.91%
2017	4,624	+0.64%
2023	5,093	+1.62%
Source: INSEE

== Sights ==
- The church of Notre-Dame, rebuilt, as was most of the town, after World War I
- The remains of a Prévôté building (once belonging to an abbey)
- The Commonwealth War Graves Commission cemetery
- A German World War I cemetery

== See also ==
- Communes of the Pas-de-Calais department
