= Neufossé Canal =

Canal in France

Canal de Neufossé
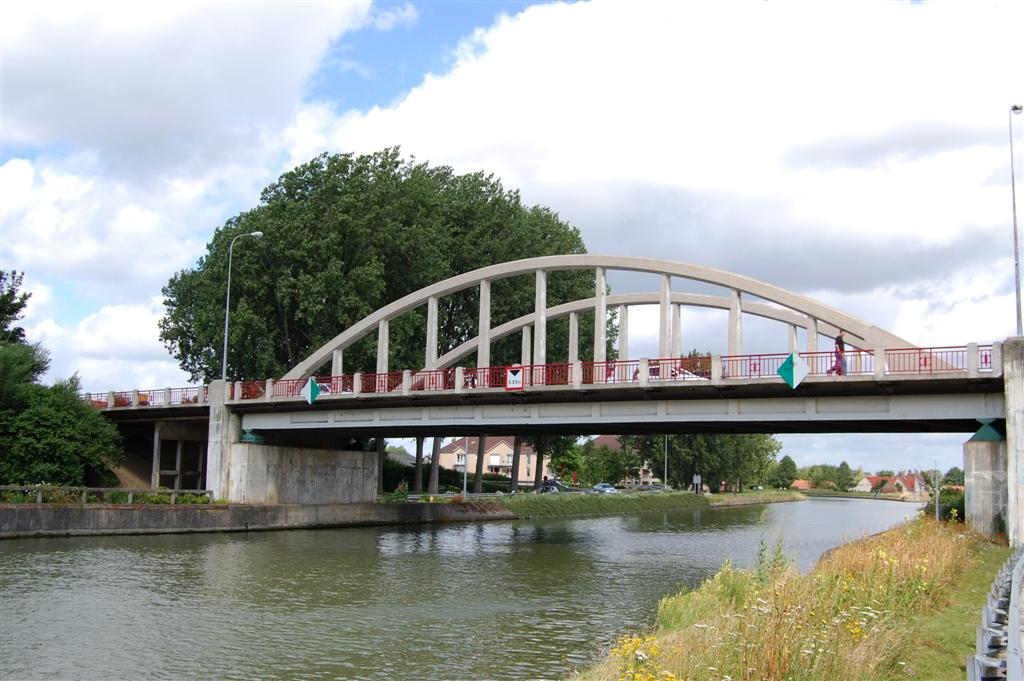
- The Pont-de-Flandre in Arques on the Canal de Neufossé
- Interactive map of Canal de Neufossé

Specifications
- Total rise: 18 km (11 mi)

Geography
- Start point: Arques
- End point: Aire-sur-la-Lys
- Beginning coordinates: 50.73700°N 2.29717°E
- Ending coordinates: 50.64429°N 2.41081°E
- Branch of: Canal Dunkerque-Escaut
- Connects to: Aa River in Arques, Canal d'Aire in Aire-sur-la-Lys.

The Canal de Neufossé (French pronunciation: [kanal də nøfose]) is a French canal connecting the Aa River in Arques to the Canal d'Aire in Aire-sur-la-Lys. It is a segment of the Canal Dunkerque-Escaut. In 1760, the Neufossé canal was built to link the river Lys to the Aa, and give Lille and other inland towns a French route to the sea.

== See also ==
- List of canals in France
