= Rond =

Rond may refer to:

- Bassin Rond, pond near Estrun, France
- Joseph Rond, American tug of war competitor who competed in the 1920 Summer Olympics

== See also ==
- Lerond, a surname
