= Oise (river) =

River in Belgium and France

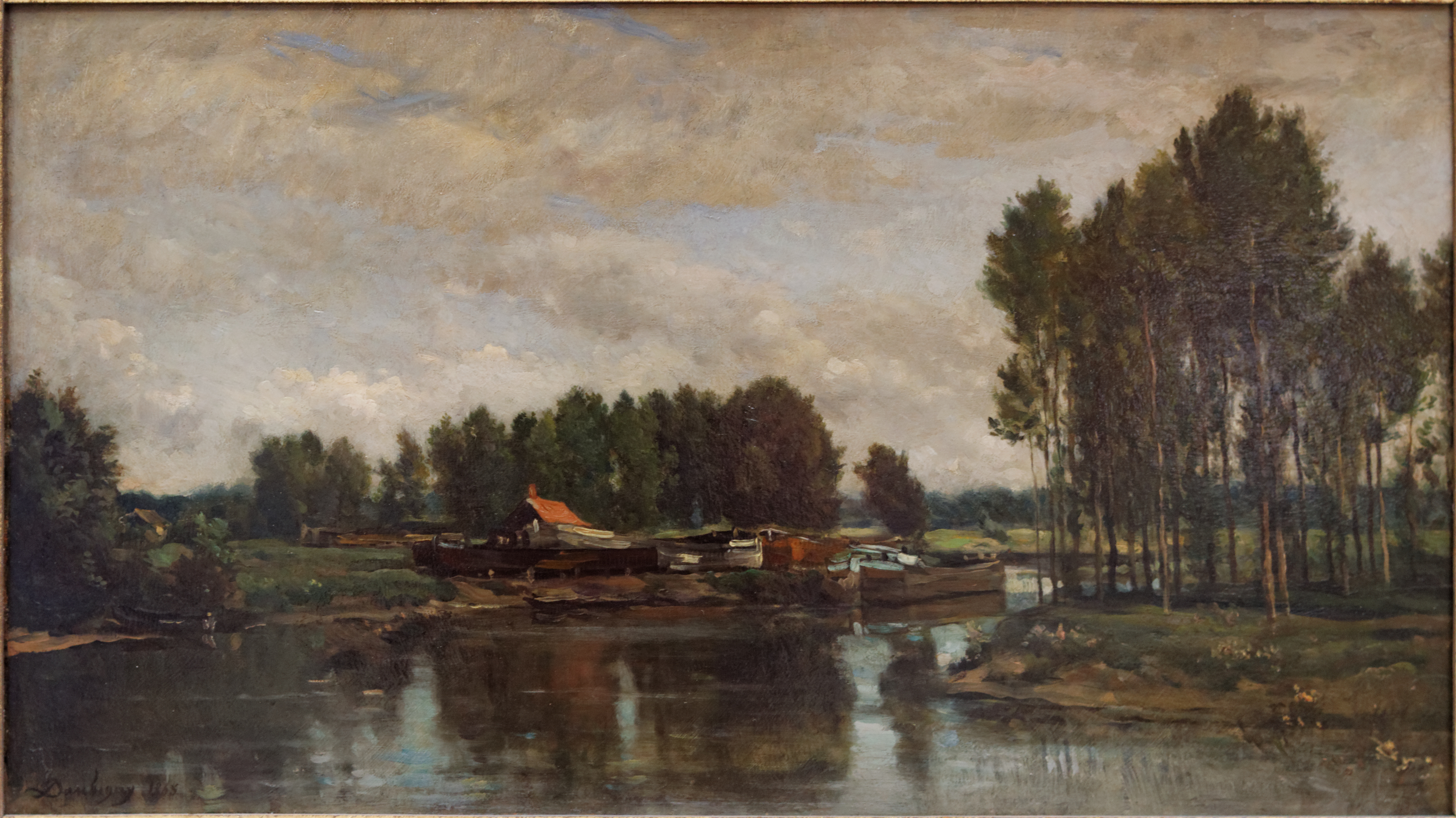
- Boats on the Oise, Charles-François Daubigny, 1865

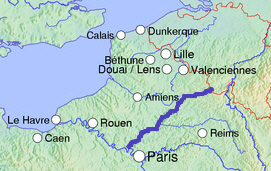

Location
- Countries: France and Belgium

Physical characteristics
- Source
  - location: Hainaut
  - elevation: 309 m (1,014 ft)
- Mouth
  - location: Seine
  - coordinates: 48°59′12″N 2°4′17″E
- Length: 341 km (212 mi)
- Basin size: 17,000 km^{2} (6,600 mi^{2})
- Discharge
  - average: 110 m^{3}/s (3,900 cu ft/s)

Basin features
- Progression: Seine→ English Channel

The Oise (/wɑːz/ WAHZ; French: [waz]; Picard: Oése) is a river of Belgium and France, flowing for 341 km (212 mi) from its source in the Belgian province of Hainaut, south of Chimay. It crosses the border with France after about 20 km (12 mi), and flows into the Seine at Conflans-Sainte-Honorine, a north-western suburb of Paris. Its main tributary is the Aisne. It gave its name to the French departments of Oise and Val-d'Oise.

== Places along the river ==
In France, the Oise flows through the following départements and towns:

- Aisne: Hirson, Guise, Chauny
- Oise (named after the river): Noyon, Compiègne, Creil
- Val-d'Oise (named after the river): Auvers-sur-Oise, Pontoise, Cergy, Jouy-le-Moutier
- Yvelines: Conflans-Sainte-Honorine

== Navigation ==
Over the past few centuries, the Oise has played an important role as an inland shipping waterway connecting the Seine (and thus Paris) with the coastal regions of northern France, Belgium, and the Netherlands. Robert Louis Stevenson described his canoeing trip on the Oise in his first published book, An Inland Voyage.

With the projected construction of the Seine-Nord Europe Canal, a high-capacity water transport system currently in development, the Oise will be linked at Janville, north of Compiègne, with the high-capacity Canal Dunkerque-Escaut, east of Arleux. The Seine-Nord Europe Canal will replace the old Canal de Saint-Quentin and the current Canal du Nord, the capacity of which is far below standard. When the new Seine-Nord connection is complete, it will allow large vessels to transport goods from the Seine, and thus Paris and its surrounding area, to the ports of Dunkirk, Antwerp and Rotterdam.

Part of the overall project consists of upgrading the river Oise itself between Creil and Compiègne, a project called MAGEO (Mise au gabarit européen de l'Oise) that was put out to public consultation in 2013. Some bends need to be eased and bridges raised to meet the requirements of a class Vb inland waterway.

== Tributaries ==
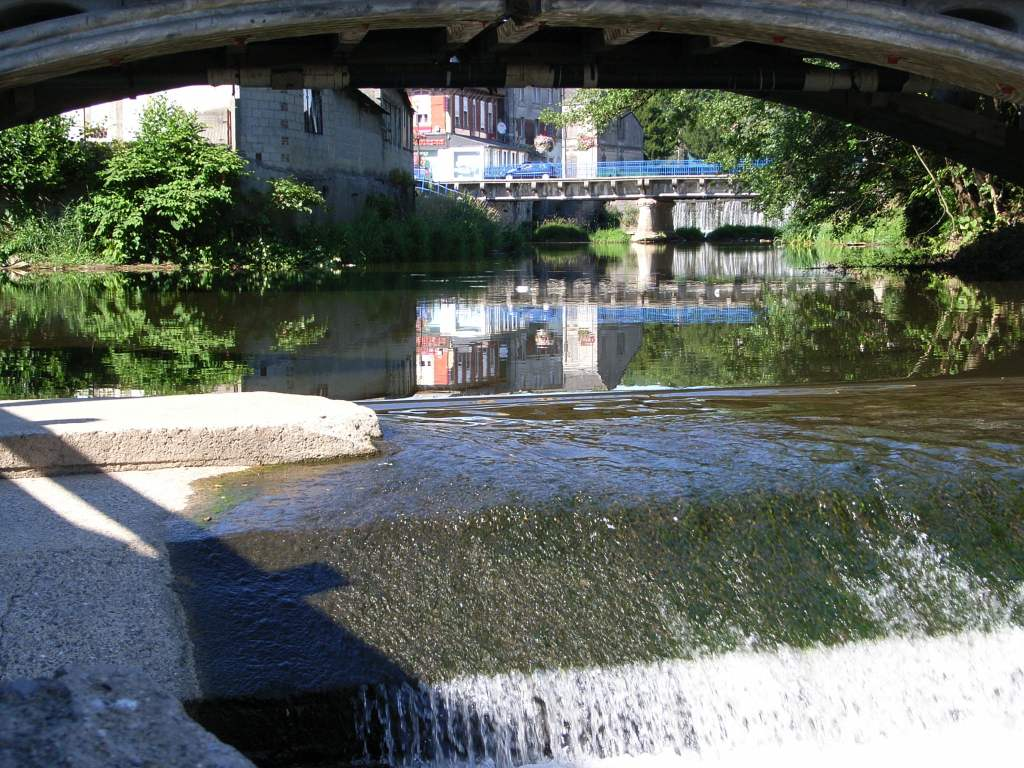
The river at Hirson

Tributaries include

=== Right bank ===
- Noirieu
- Divette
- Mas or Matz
- Aronde
- Brèche
- Thérain

=== Left bank ===
- Gland
- Thon
- Serre
- Ailette
- Ru de Servais
- Aisne
- Automne
- Nonette
- Thève

== Tourism development and promotion ==
The EuroVelo 3 European cycle route runs alongside the Oise River from Verberie to Hirson. This route incorporates several cycling facilities—most of which were recently completed—including an 8 km cycle path from Lacroix-Saint-Ouen to Compiègne, a 28 km section using shared roads (low-traffic secondary roads signposted as a cycle route), the Sambre-Oise Canal towpath converted into a 36 km greenway from Abbécourt to Ribemont, and the "Axe Vert de Thiérache" greenway, built on a former railway line in the upper Oise valley between Guise and Hirson. The route crosses the Oise again 4 km upstream from Hirson, near the Bayard Pond in the Hirson Forest. Some sections are still in the planning or construction stage.

== See also ==
- Canal latéral à l'Oise
- List of rivers of France
- List of canals in France
