= Aire Canal =

Canal in France

Coordinates: 50°38′N 2°25′E

Canal d'Aire

History
- Current owner: VNF

Geography
- Start point: Aire-sur-la-Lys.
- End point: Bauvin
- Branch of: Canal Dunkerque-Escaut
- Connects to: Canal de Neufossé, Canal de la Deûle

The Canal d'Aire (French pronunciation: [kanal dɛʁ]) is a French canal connecting the Canal de Neufossé in Aire-sur-la-Lys to the Canal de la Deûle in Bauvin. It is a segment of the Canal Dunkerque-Escaut.

== See also ==
- List of canals in France
