= Basse Colme Canal =

Canal in northern France

Coordinates: 50.9879°N 2.5193°E

Canal de la Basse Colme
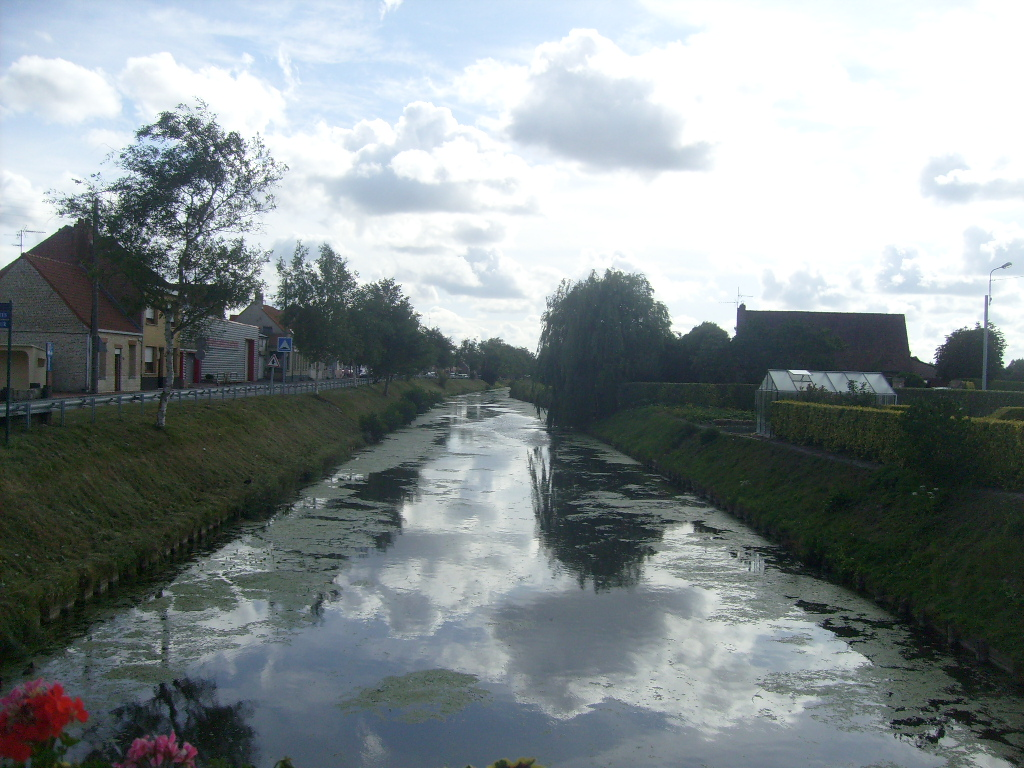
- Canal Lower Colme (Canal de Bergues in Belgium: Bergenvaart) leaving at Bergues Hoymille
- Interactive map of Canal de la Basse Colme

Specifications
- Length: 13 km (8.1 mi)
- Locks: 1
- Status: Downgraded.

History
- Construction began: 1293

Geography
- Start point: Bergues
- End point: Hondschoote
- Branch of: Canal de la Colme
- Connects to: Canal de Bergues, Canal de la Haute Colme

The Canal de la Basse Colme is a canal in northern France from Bergues to Hondschoote on the Belgian border. It is the eastern segment of the Canal de la Colme. In Belgium, it continues as the Canal de Bergues (in Dutch: Bergenvaart).

Today, this channel is downgraded.

== History ==
In the castellany of Furnes, the name given to the channel was Bergenvaart or Kolme (Canal de Bergues Canal Colme). During the Middle Ages, the canal was a very important trade route. In 1622, it was improved and a lock was built by the Spaniards in time of war Houthem to prevent flooding from Bergues. The French side of the canal has been deepened and it looks like much more of an industrial canal. The Belgian side has kept its medieval character.

== See also ==
- List of canals in France
