= Sambre–Oise Canal =

Canal in Northern France

Coordinates: 50.1264°N 3.6875°E

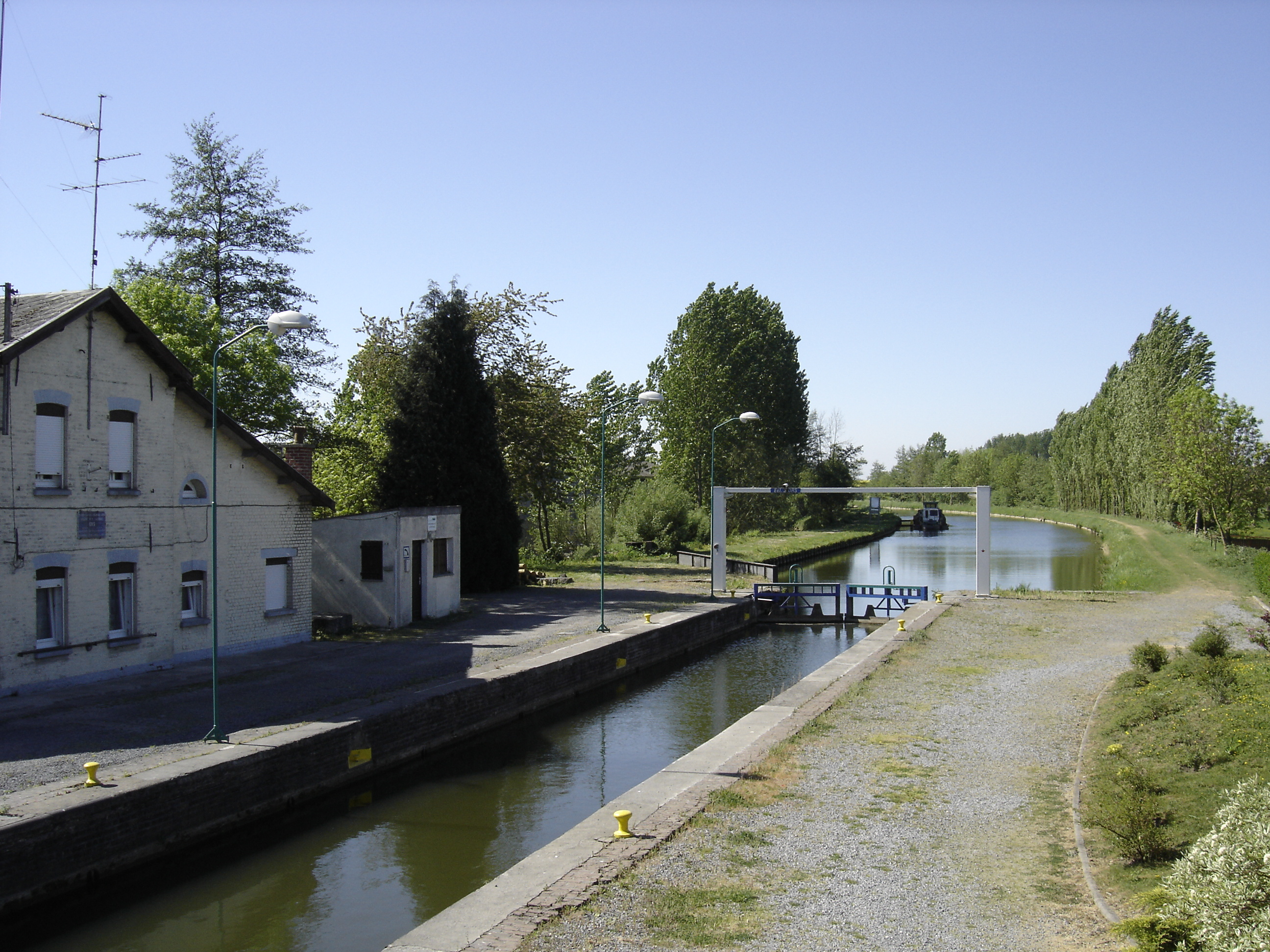
Sambre-Oise Canal; a lock in Ors

The Canal de la Sambre à l'Oise (French pronunciation: [kanal də la sɑ̃bʁ a lwaz]) is a canal in northern France. It forms a connection between the canalised river Sambre (Meuse basin) at Landrecies and the Oise (Seine basin) at La Fère. The canal is 71 kilometres (44 mi) long, and has 38 locks. The junction made at La Fère is with a branch of the Canal de Saint-Quentin, while the Canal latéral à l'Oise is joined 10.5 km further downstream at Chauny. It was used by the standard Freycinet-gauge péniches, 38.50 metres (126.3 ft) long, and 5.05 metres (16.6 ft) in beam, carrying up to 250 tonnes. The canal, also a popular waterway for boats heading south from the Netherlands and Belgium to the central French waterways, had to be closed in 2006 when two aqueducts were found to be in danger of failing. Funding has been put in place by the owner, Voies Navigables de France, and the local authorities, with support from the State. The canal was reopened in July 2021.

== World War I battle ==
The Sambre–Oise Canal saw one of the last Allied victories of World War I before the Armistice with Germany which came into effect at 11.00 am on 11 November 1918.

The forcing of the Sambre–Oise Canal took place on 4 November 1918. Participating in the operation were the 2nd Battalion Royal Sussex, as well as the 2nd Manchesters, to which the poet Wilfred Owen belonged. The Lancashire Fusiliers also took part in the battle. The British forces were to cross some fields surrounded by high hedges, then cross the canal at a point where there was a lockhouse. The Germans had this area defended with machine guns and rifle teams.

As the 2nd Battalion advanced on the canal, the Royal Engineers placed small footbridges across the lock. Some Royal Sussex Regiment men actually climbed up onto the lock gates, one of them firing his Lewis gun from the hip as he went. Eventually the British managed to take the lockhouse and pushed on to their final objective near the Étreux road.

Wilfred Owen, officer and poet, was killed as he crossed the Sambre–Oise Canal at the head of a raiding party: Owen's death occurred only a week before the war ended.

== See also ==
- Battle of the Sambre (1918)
