= SNEC =

SNEC may refer to:

- Singapore National Eye Centre
- Seine–Nord Europe Canal
- Samastha National Education Council
