= VNF =

VNF may refer to:

- Voies navigables de France, a French navigation authority
- Virtualized Network Functions, software implementations of network functions that can be deployed on a Network Function Virtualization Infrastructure
