= Sensée Canal =

Canal in northern France

Canal de la Sensée
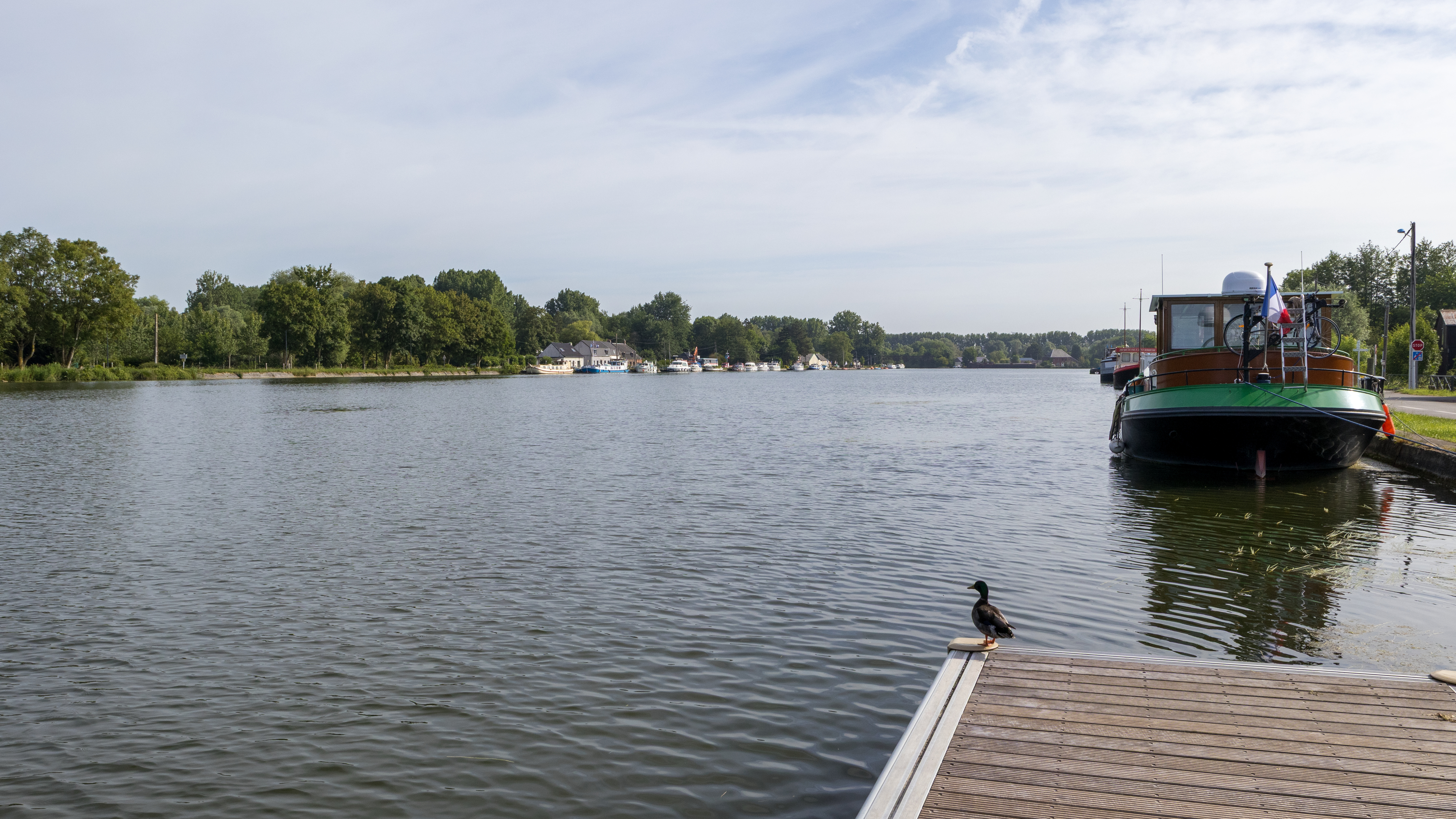
- The Bassin Rond - a small artificial lake where the Escaut meets the Canal de la Sensée near Estrun
- Interactive map of Canal de la Sensée

Specifications
- Length: 25 km (16 mi)

History
- Current owner: VNF
- Principal engineer: Augustin Honnorez
- Date approved: 1806
- Construction began: 1819
- Date completed: 1820

Geography
- Start point: Scarpe near Douai
- End point: Scheldt in Hordain
- Beginning coordinates: 50.3395°N 3.0534°E

The Canal de la Sensée (French pronunciation: [kanal də la sɑ̃se]) is a canal in northern France. The project was developed under Napoleon. In March 1806, the imperial government gave orders to build a canal which would link the Scarpe River and the Escaut River (English: Scheldt). The work was commenced under the direction of Augustin Honnorez in June 1819 and the Sensée canal was opened to navigation in November 1820. At that time the boats were pulled by men or horses working for boat employers. Shortly after World War I 1914-1918, horses were replaced by tractors.

The Canal de la Sensée forms part of the Canal Dunkerque-Escaut route.

Junction of the Scheldt Canal and the Sensée Canal at Bouchain.

== See also ==
- Sensée River
- List of canals in France
