= Seine–Nord Europe Canal =

Planned high-capacity shipping canal in France

Seine-Nord Europe Canal
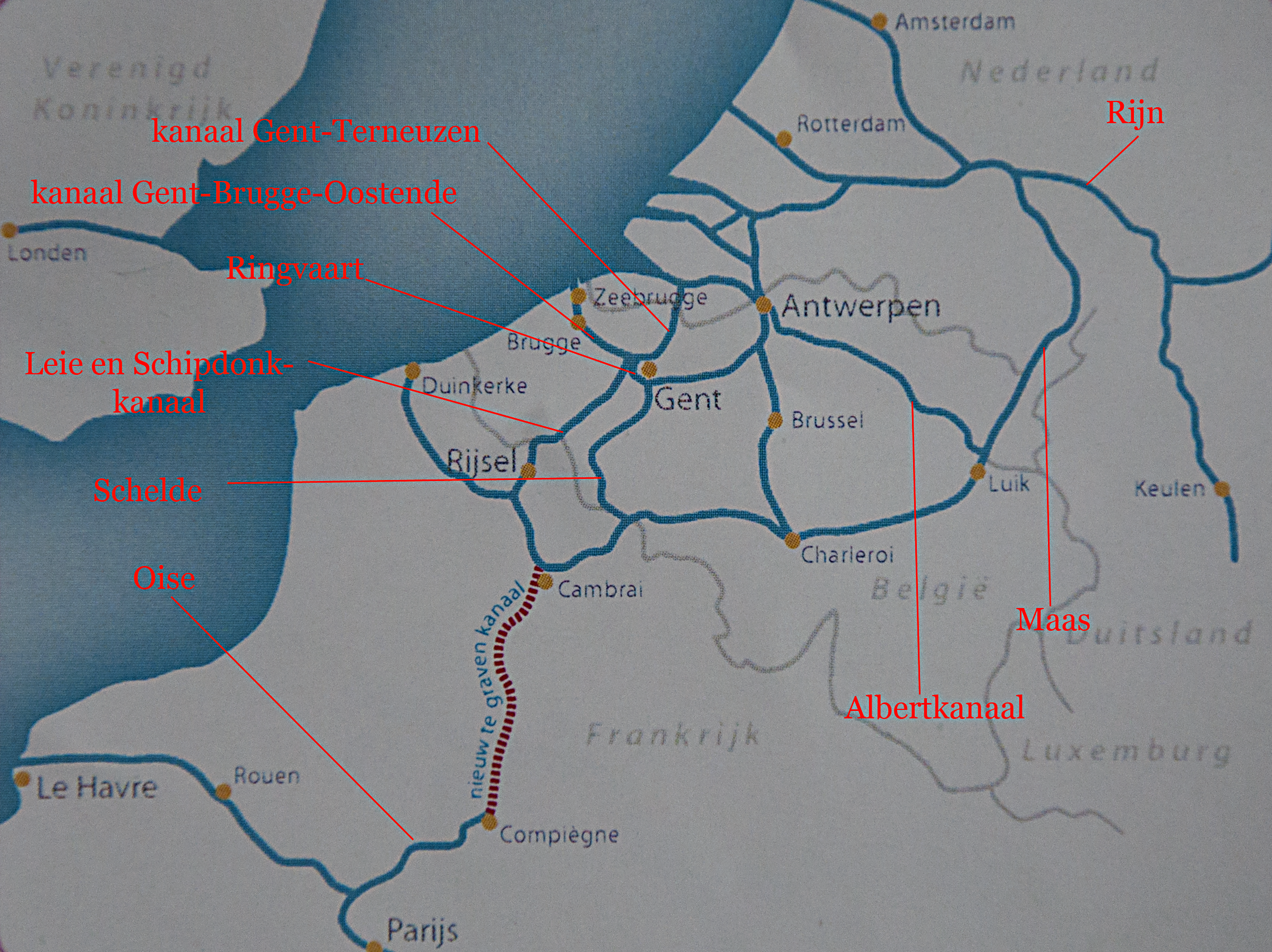
- Location of the Seine-Nord Europe Canal in northern France.
- Interactive map of Seine-Nord Europe Canal

Specifications
- Length: 107 km (66 mi)
- Lock length: 195 m (640 ft)
- Lock width: 12.50 m (41.0 ft)
- Maximum boat length: 185 m (607 ft) (push-tug + 2 barges)
- Maximum boat beam: 11.40 m (37.4 ft)
- Minimum boat draft: 3.50 m (11.5 ft)
- Locks: 6 (originally 7)
- Total rise: 53.60 m (175.9 ft)
- Status: Preparation for tender

History
- Date approved: 2009
- Expected completion: 2032

Geography
- Start point: Oise at Compiègne
- End point: Dunkirk-Scheldt Canal at Aubencheul-au-Bac
- Connects to: River Oise

The Seine–Nord Europe Canal (French: canal Seine-Nord Europe, pronounced [kanal sɛn nɔʁ øʁɔp]) is a planned high-capacity (grand gabarit) canal in France that would link the Oise River at Compiègne with the Dunkirk-Scheldt Canal, east of Arleux. It is the French part of a proposed Seine-Scheldt canal that would ultimately connect the Rhine and Seine basins inland. The stated objective is to expand trade flows in a fuel-efficient and ecologically friendly manner between the Seine basin and Belgium, Germany and the Netherlands, while reducing saturation on the A1 motorway in France and reducing the CO_{2} emissions in the transport sector within this corridor. Completion is expected in 2032.

The canal will be the French section of the Seine-Scheldt European waterway, which includes further major investments on the Dunkirk-Scheldt Canal, on the river Lys/Leie in Flanders and on the waterways in Wallonia. It will run 107 kilometres (66 mi) from just north of Compiègne to the Dunkirk-Scheldt Canal, in the region of Hauts-de-France.

The 107-kilometre-long (66 mi) canal will connect the Seine and Scheldt rivers and facilitate inland water transport. When the new Seine-Nord connection is ready, it will allow large vessels to transport goods between the Seine (and the Paris area) and the ports of Dunkirk, Antwerp, and Rotterdam, or further into Europe. The canal will replace the Canal de Saint-Quentin and the current Canal du Nord, increasing maximum barge capacity from 650 to 4400 tonnes.

The canal will include several large structures, including six locks and three aqueducts: two over the A29 and A26 motorways, and one 1330 metres long over the Somme. The project's budget will be €4.7 billion, financed by the European Union, the French government, the Hauts-de-France and Île-de-France regions and the départements Oise, Somme, Pas-de-Calais and Nord.

The project was called into question after a change of Government in July 2012, not per se but for its cost and the principle of a public-private partnership (PPP) which, after the 2008 financial crisis, was found to be unworkable. Significant cost reductions were deemed possible, and 'reconfiguration' of the project led to use of the line of the existing Canal du Nord over a length of about 8 km (5 mi), lowering the summit level by 18.50 metres and thus eliminating one lock. Engineers were selected for the project in June 2015.

On 21 April 2016, an ordonnance was approved by the president of France, authorizing the construction of the canal and creating the Société du Canal Seine-Nord Europe to manage the project.

== Economic impact ==
The existing Canal du Nord and parallel Canal de Saint-Quentin represent a bottleneck on one of Europe's principal transport arteries. This is reflected in the current statistics: where the market share of inland water transport measured in tonne-kilometres reaches 18% in the Seine-Oise basin and 14% in Nord-Pas-de-Calais, and even more than 50% on the major waterways of Germany and Benelux, the constraints of carrying capacity on the corridor in France limit the waterway market share to between 3 and 4% (peaking at about 5 million tonnes). Traffic is projected to reach between 15 and 18 million tonnes per year a few years after the waterway has opened.

Analysis by the European Court of Auditors published in 2020 examined the economic case and stated that:

"The Seine-Scheldt inland waterway link was approved on the basis that traffic levels on the Canal Seine Nord Europe by 2060 would be four times as high as the reference situation in 2030 without the Canal. To achieve this a significant increase in freight volumes on the axis across France and Europe is necessary.

However, the statistics from the last decade do not suggest that this will occur. In addition, two specific conditions are necessary, none of which seem particularly realistic in the light of industrial trends over time:

— a fourfold increase – from 2.3 million tonnes per year to 8.1 million tonnes per year – in traditional flows of construction materials moved by inland waterways using the Canal Seine Nord Europe over the 30 years following entry into service. For such a significant modal shift to come about, various accompanying conditions (e.g. tolling) would need to be put in place.

— a massive diversion of containerised road traffic to waterways, resulting in 36 % of freight on the entire traffic axis being shifted onto the waterway. This would require the current proportion of freight carried by waterway on that axis to be multiplied by 38, or the share of container traffic volumes to be three times as high as it currently is for the entire Rhine river."

== Environmental impact ==
Voies navigables de France, the project authority, sets out the principal environmental impacts on the website dedicated to the project. The CO_{2} emissions of a barge carrying 1500 tonnes are three times less than those of the fleet of trucks required to move this load. A single push-tow 185 m long can carry 300 containers unloaded in a maritime port, compared to 5 fully loaded trains and 200 trucks.

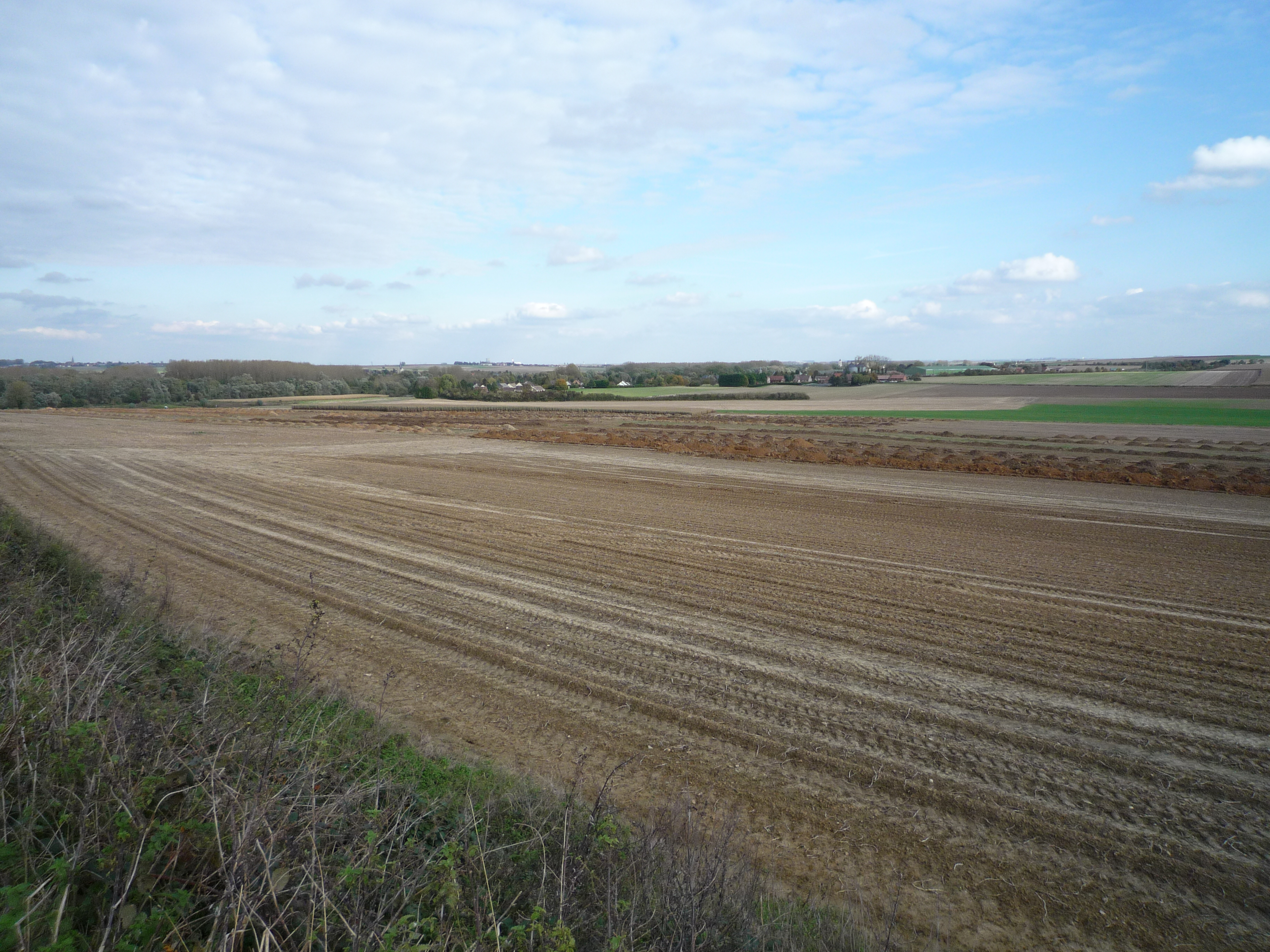
Diagnostic archaeological excavations on the route of the canal Seine-Nord Europe in October 2008. In the background, village Aubencheul-au-Bac
