= Calais Canal =

Canal in France

Coordinates: 50°57′N 1°51′E

Canal de Calais
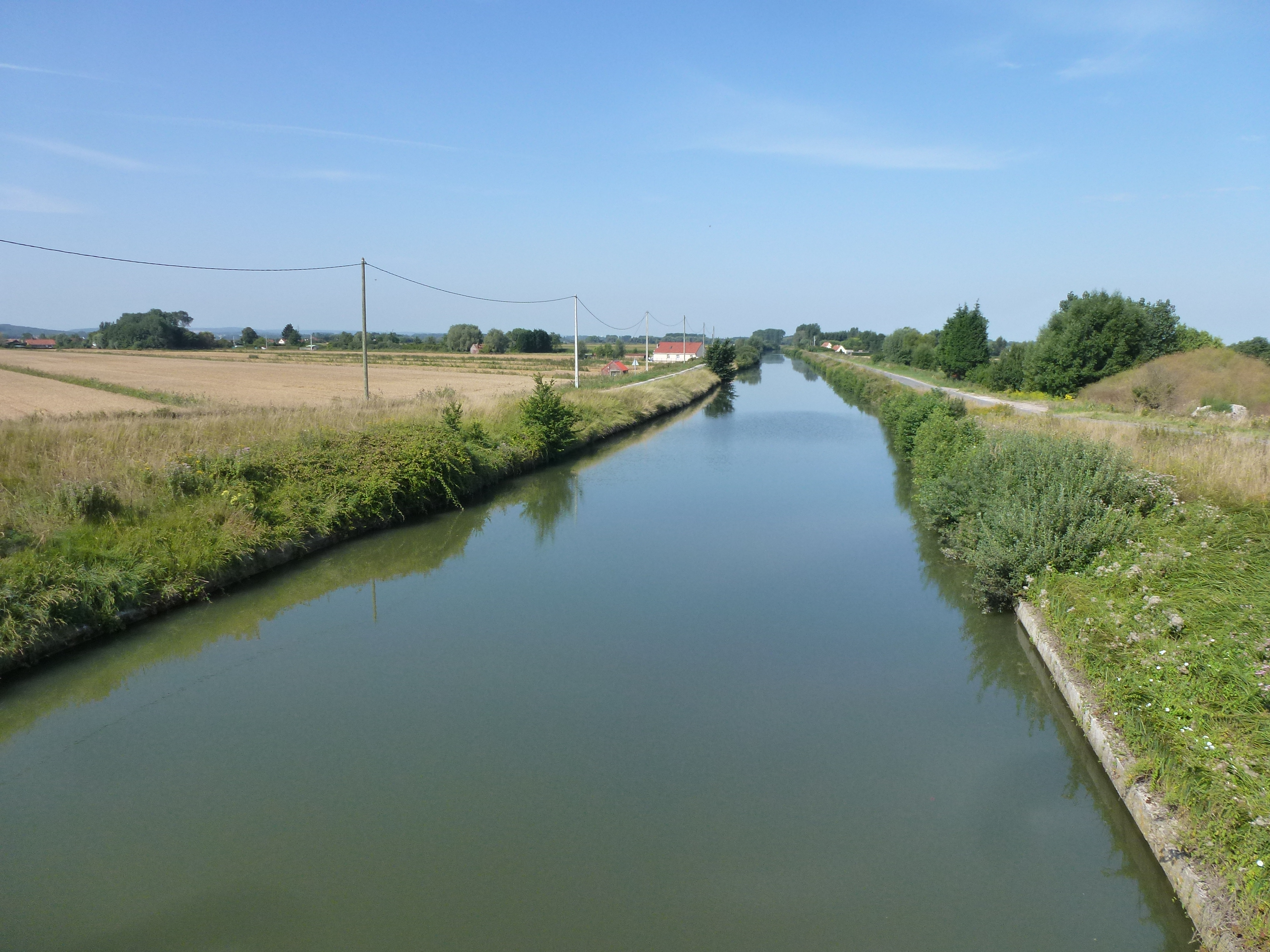
- The canal near Ruminghem

Specifications
- Length: 30 km (19 mi)
- Locks: 3

Geography
- Start point: Port of Calais and English Channel
- End point: Aa River near Ruminghem

The Canal de Calais (French pronunciation: [kanal də kalɛ]) connects the Aa River near Ruminghem to the inner basins of the Port of Calais. Many boats enter the French canal system through the port of Calais and this canal. It is 30 km long and has 3 locks.

== History ==
Work started on the canal in the late 17th century, but it was not opened until 1758. The canal was enlarged for Class II 'Campinois' and ‘Canal du Nord’ craft in the 1980s over two thirds of its length. The upgrading remains incomplete.

== See also ==
- List of canals in France
