= Bourthes =

Bourthes Boorte
- Commune
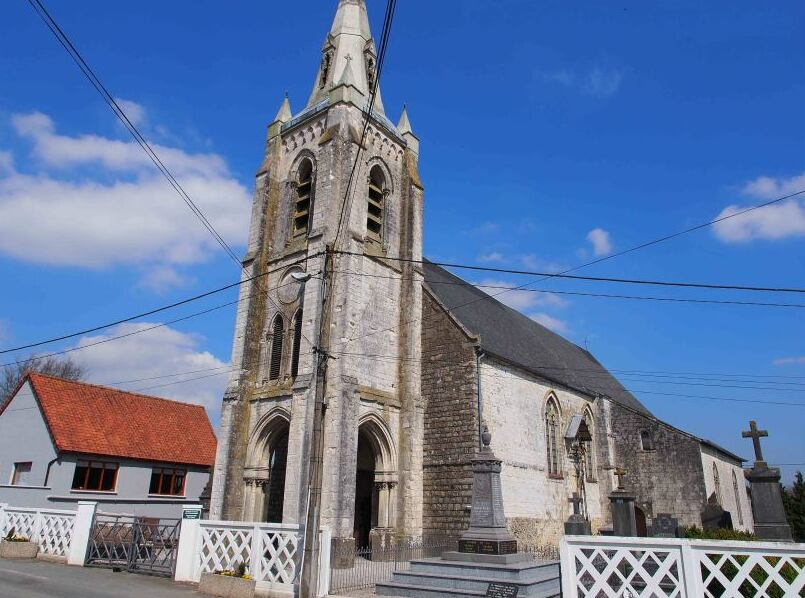
- The church of Bourthes

- Coat of arms
- Location of Bourthes
- Location within France Location within Hauts-de-France
- Coordinates: 50°36′25″N 1°56′03″E
- Country: France
- Region: Hauts-de-France
- Department: Pas-de-Calais
- Arrondissement: Montreuil
- Canton: Lumbres
- Intercommunality: CC Haut Pays du Montreuillois

Government
  - Mayor (2020–2026): Estelle Doutriaux
- Area^{1}: 22.33 km^{2} (8.62 sq mi)
- Elevation: 120 m (390 ft)
- Highest elevation: 183 m (600 ft)
- Lowest elevation: 112 m (367 ft)
- Population (2023): 860
  - Density: 39/km^{2} (100/sq mi)
- Time zone: UTC+01:00 (CET)
  - Summer (DST): UTC+02:00 (CEST)
- INSEE/Postal code: 62168 /62650
- ^{1} French Land Register data, which excludes lakes, ponds, glaciers > 1 km^{2} (0.386 sq mi or 247 acres) and river estuaries.

Bourthes (French pronunciation: [buʁt]; West Flemish: Boorte) is a commune in the Pas-de-Calais department in the Hauts-de-France region in northern France.

== Geography ==
A village situated some 15 miles (24 km) southeast of Boulogne-sur-Mer at the D128 and D131 crossroads. The source of the river Aa is found here.

== Population ==
Historical population
| Year | Pop. | ±% p.a. |
|---|---|---|
| 1968 | 676 | — |
| 1975 | 722 | +0.94% |
| 1982 | 703 | −0.38% |
| 1990 | 629 | −1.38% |
| 1999 | 545 | −1.58% |
| 2007 | 661 | +2.44% |
| 2012 | 808 | +4.10% |
| 2017 | 853 | +1.09% |
| 2023 | 860 | +0.14% |
Source: INSEE

== See also ==
- Communes of the Pas-de-Calais department
