= Scarpe Mountain =

Mountain in Alberta and British Columbia, Canada

- Location within Alberta Location within British Columbia Location within Canada

Highest point
- Elevation: 2,591 m (8,501 ft)
- Prominence: 557 m (1,827 ft)
- Listing: Mountains of Alberta; Mountains of British Columbia
- Coordinates: 49°12′48″N 114°24′08″W

Geography
- Country: Canada
- Provinces: Alberta and British Columbia
- District: Kootenay Land District
- Parent range: Flathead Range
- Topo map: NTS 82G1 Sage Creek

Scarpe Mountain is located at the head of Commerce Creek and straddles the Continental Divide marking the Alberta-British Columbia border. It was named after the Scarpe River in France.

== See also ==
- List of peaks on the Alberta–British Columbia border
