= Hôtel de Ville, Aire-sur-la-Lys =

Town hall in Aire-sur-la-Lys, France

Hôtel de Ville
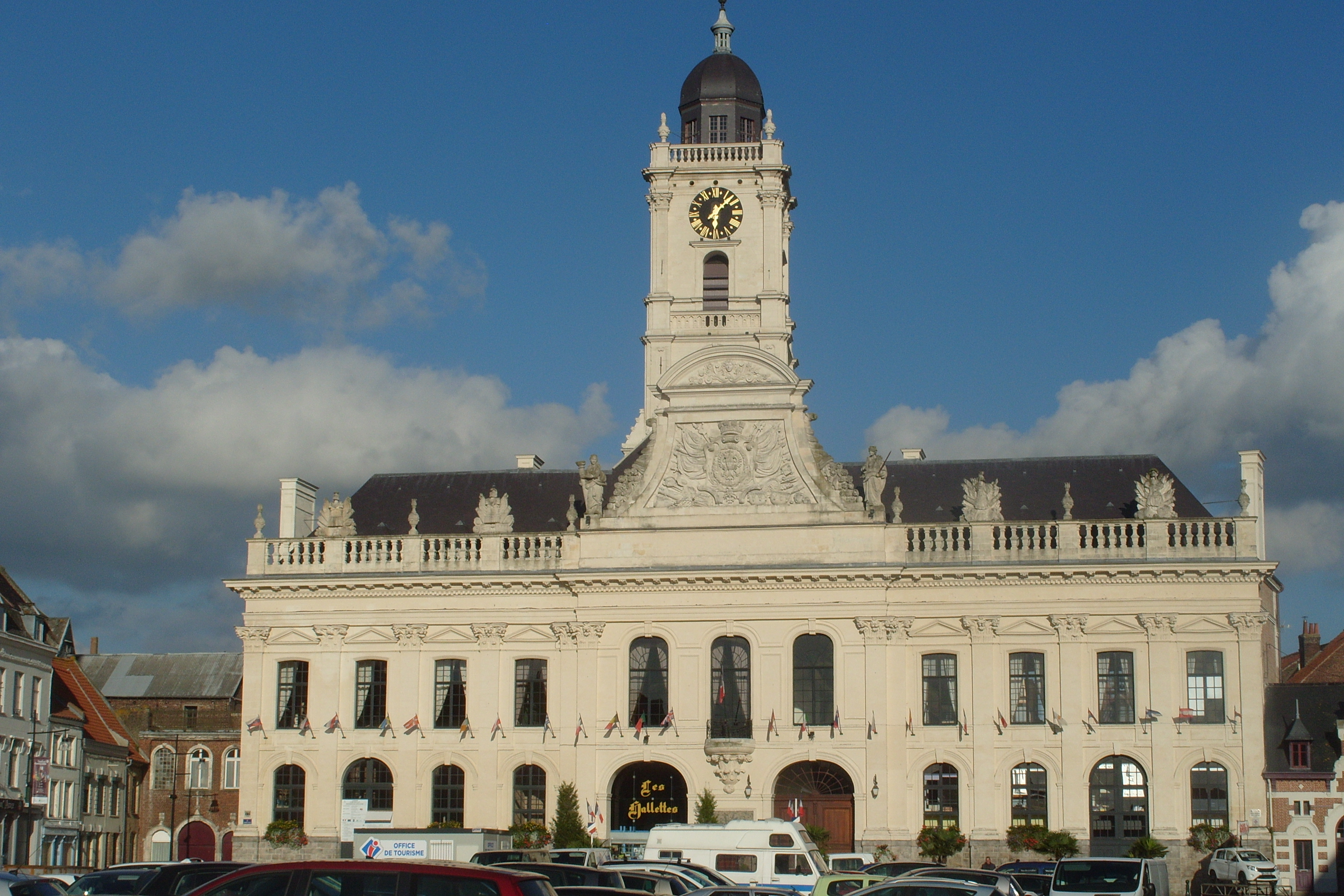
- The main frontage of the Hôtel de Ville in September 2015

General information
- Type: City hall
- Architectural style: Baroque style
- Location: Aire-sur-la-Lys, France
- Coordinates: 50.6384°N 2.3958°E
- Completed: 1721

Height
- Height: 58 metres (190 ft)

Design and construction
- Architects: Jacques Héroguel

UNESCO World Heritage Site
- Part of: Belfries of Belgium and France
- Criteria: Cultural: ii, iv
- Reference: 943
- Inscription: 1999 (23rd Session)

Monument historique
- Official name: Hôtel de ville et beffroi
- Type: Inscrit
- Designated: 1947
- Reference no.: PA00107942

The Hôtel de Ville (French pronunciation: [otɛl də vil], City Hall) is a municipal building in Aire-sur-la-Lys, Pas-de-Calais, in northern France, standing on the Grand-Place. It was designated a monument historique by the French government in 1947.

== History ==
The first municipal building was a market hall erected in around 1355. A tower was constructed in wood on a site adjacent to the market hall at around the same time. Both buildings were destroyed in a fire in 1373 and the tower was rebuilt in stone in 1447. Following the siege and destruction of much of the town by Dutch forces in 1710 during the War of the Spanish Succession, the town hall and belfry were left in ruins. Under the Peace of Utrecht in 1713, the town reverted to France and King Louis XIV directed that the people of the town be compensated and therefore authorised the construction of a new town hall and tower, but insisted that the tower be erected behind the town hall. The consuls led by the mayor, François de Lencquesaing, decided to proceed with the new complex in 1715 and construction began in May 1716. The new building was designed by Jacques Héroguel in the Baroque style, built by Pierre Descamps in ashlar stone and was completed in 1721.

The design involved a symmetrical main frontage of 11 bays facing onto the Grand-Place. The central section of three bays, which was slightly projected forward, incorporated two large round-headed openings with moulded surrounds and keystones on the ground floor, three round-headed windows with moulded surrounds and keystones on the first floor, and an ornate segmental-headed pediment bearing a depiction of King Louis XV at roof level. The wings were fenestrated by round-headed windows on the ground floor and by segmental headed windows with triangular pediments on the first floor. The main frontage was decorated with full-height Corinthian order pilasters supporting a frieze, an entablature and a cornice; statues representing strength and justice were installed on either side of the pediment and the wings were surmounted by balustraded parapets. A new tower was installed behind the town hall, located slightly to the left of centre of the main axis, in order to maintain symmetry at the end of the street behind; it was 58 metres (190 ft) high.

During the French Revolution, the depiction of King Louis XV on the pediment was torn down and replaced by a carving of the municipal coat of arms. The ground floor of the left hand-wing accommodated shops until 1830, while the ground floor of the right-hand wing accommodated a public house until 1851. The tower was hit by lightning in July 1872 and was damaged by a fire in March 1914. The complex, like most of the town, suffered some damage in April 1918, during the Battle of the Lys, part of the First World War.

In 2005, the belfry was added to the UNESCO World Heritage List as part of the Belfries of Belgium and France site because of its architecture and historical importance in maintaining municipal power in Europe.
