= Colme Canal =

Canal in France and Belgium

Coordinates: 50°50′N 2°12′E

Canal de la Colme
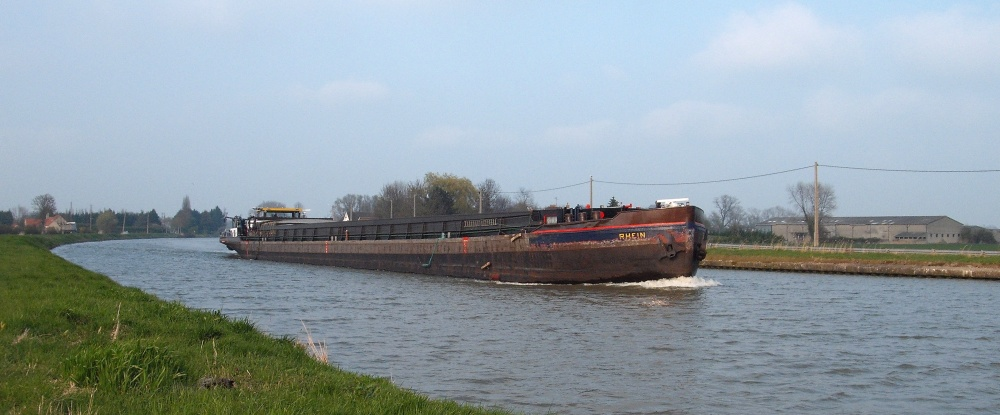
- Canal de la Colme

Specifications
- Status: In service from Watten to Bergues and decommissioned from Bergues to Hondschoote

Geography
- Branch(es): Canal de la Haute Colme, Canal de la Basse Colme

The Canal de la Colme is a canal in France and Belgium comprising the Canal de la Haute Colme and the Canal de la Basse Colme. It spans 25 kilometers and has three locks, of which only two remain. It was constructed as a flood way some time in the seventeenth century. It currently connects the river Colme to the Aa.

== See also ==
- List of canals in France
