= Deûle Canal =

Canal in northern France

Coordinates: 50°44′N 2°56′E

Canal de la Deûle
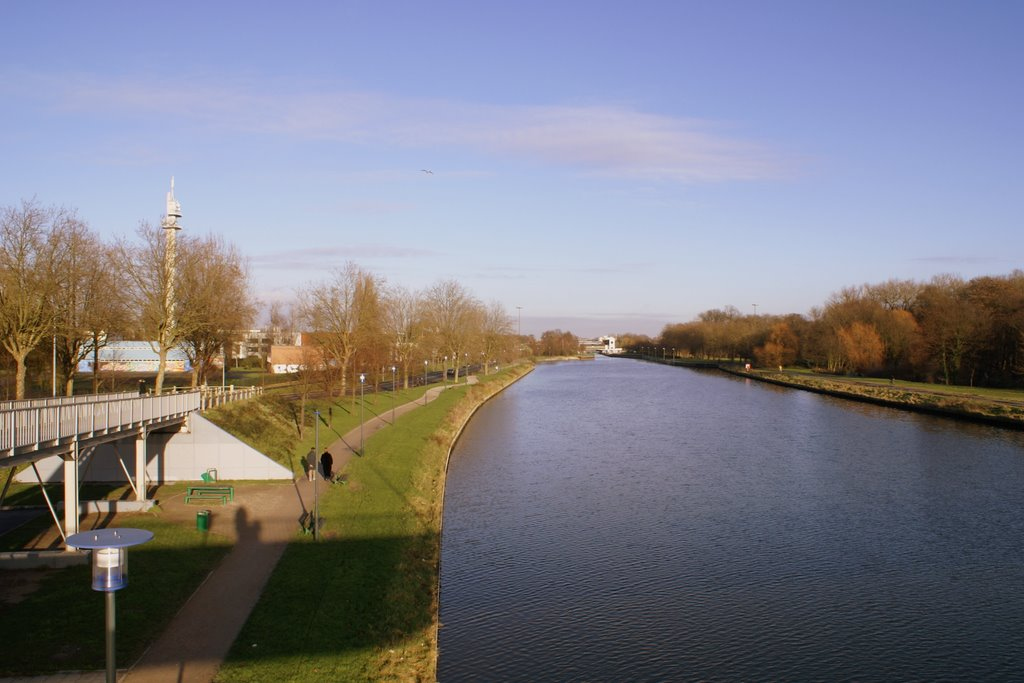
- Bridge over Canal de la Deûle in Lambersart, with the Grand Carré lock in the background

Specifications
- Length: 34.8 km
- Lock length: 144.60 m
- Lock width: 12 m
- Maximum boat beam: 11.40 m
- Minimum boat draft: 3.00 m
- Minimum boat air draft: 5.25 m
- Locks: 3

Geography
- Start point: Bauvin
- End point: Deûlémont on the river Lys (near the Belgian border)
- Connects to: Liaison Dunkerque-Escaut, Lys

The Canal de la Deûle (French pronunciation: [kanal də la døl]) is one of the oldest canals in northern France, originally connecting the river Scarpe near Douai with the river Lys at Deûlémont near the Belgian border. Roughly half of its original length has been absorbed in the high-capacity Dunkerque-Escaut waterway, as shown on the map, and the remaining length through the port of Lille is often considered as a branch of the main route, hence the alternative names Liaison or Antenne Bauvin-Lys. This official name was never adopted by the local population, which refers simply to the Deûle, evoking its original state as a natural river, although it has the size and the appearance of a built canal. It is 34.8 kilometres (21.6 mi) long with 3 locks.

== History ==
Parts of the Deule were made navigable as early as the 13th century, but goods had to be portaged round a natural sill at an island, which gave its name to the regional capital Lille. It was linked with the Scarpe in the 17th century and the Lys in the 18th.

== Navigation ==
As with many other small streams in the lowlands of France, Belgium and the Netherlands, the destiny of the relatively short river Deûle was to become a heavily engineered waterway, to serve the transport needs of industry. However, this construction of a wide and deep channel also serves other functions the value of which is recognized by the EU's Water Framework Directive. 'Heavily modified water bodies' like the successive reaches of the Deûle form an environment that is worth preserving for overall environmental benefits that are very different from the hypothetical situation where the stream were to be left in its natural state. Navigation is more than ever the principal function, and upgrading of the waterway downstream of Lille is currently proceeding, to provide European Class Vb dimensions, for push-tows of up to 180m long and 12m in beam.

The former line of the Canal de la Deûle remains in water and have been transferred to ownership of the Métropole Européenne de Lille (MEL) for development as recreational and recreational assets. A boat harbour is planned in the large basin on the Canteleu arm of the Deûle, to provide Lille with a facility that will encourage passing boats to stop and spend time in the city.

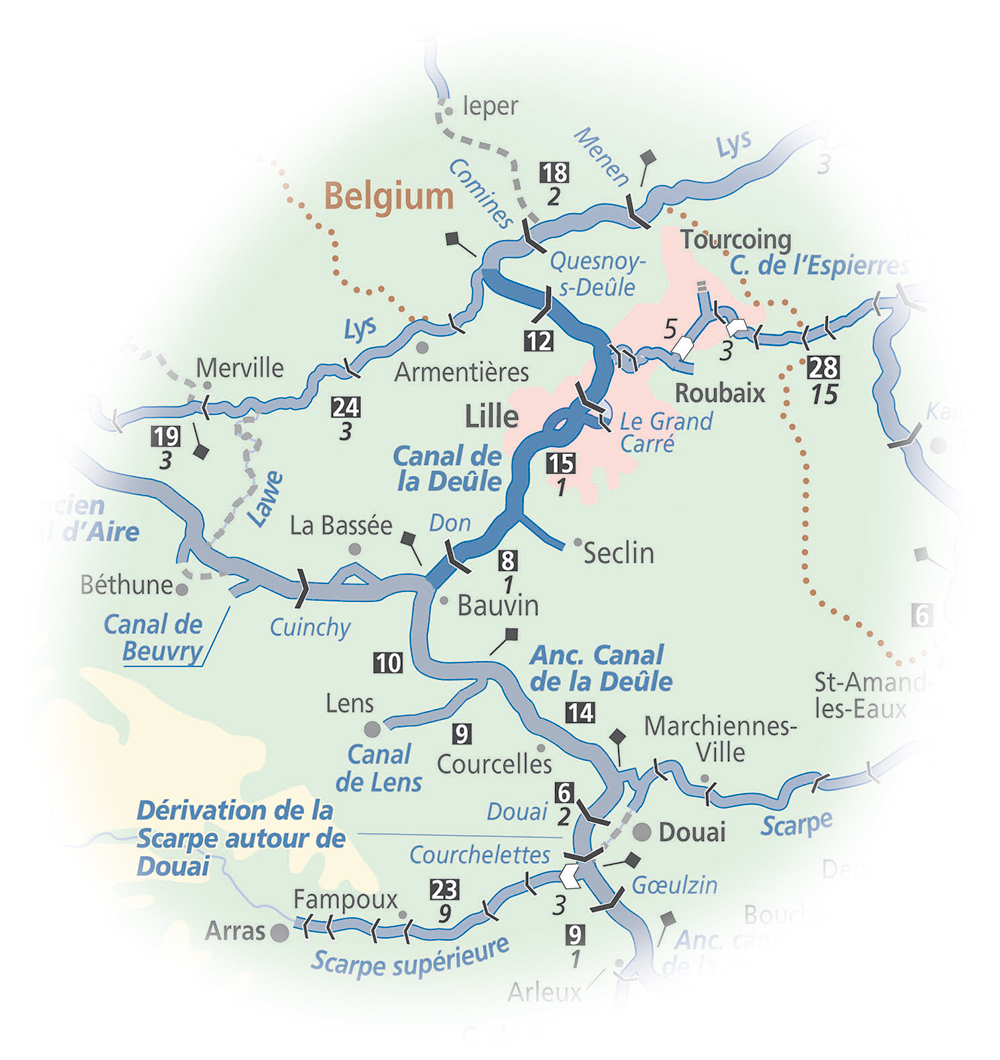
Route of the Canal de la Deûle, showing how part of the original canal has now been incorporated in the Dunkerque-Escaut waterway

== En route ==
The map shows the route. Starting at the Lys river (PK 35), it passes through the village of Deûlémont and a boat harbour at site of a former lock (PK 34), Quesnoy-sur-Deûle (PK 30), Wambrechies (PK 25) with another popular boat harbour, Marquette-lez-Lille and the junction with the Canal de Roubaix (PK 23), Lille (PK 21-16), then Don (Nord) (PK 4) to reach the triangular junction with the main waterway at Bauvin (PK 0). The part of the old canal that has been 'taken over' by the Liaison Dunkerque-Escaut passes through Courcelles-lès-Lens, Carvin, Pont-à-Vendin to connect with the Scarpe river in Douai.

== See also ==
- List of canals in France
- Classification of European Inland Waterways
