= Aa (France) =

River in northern France

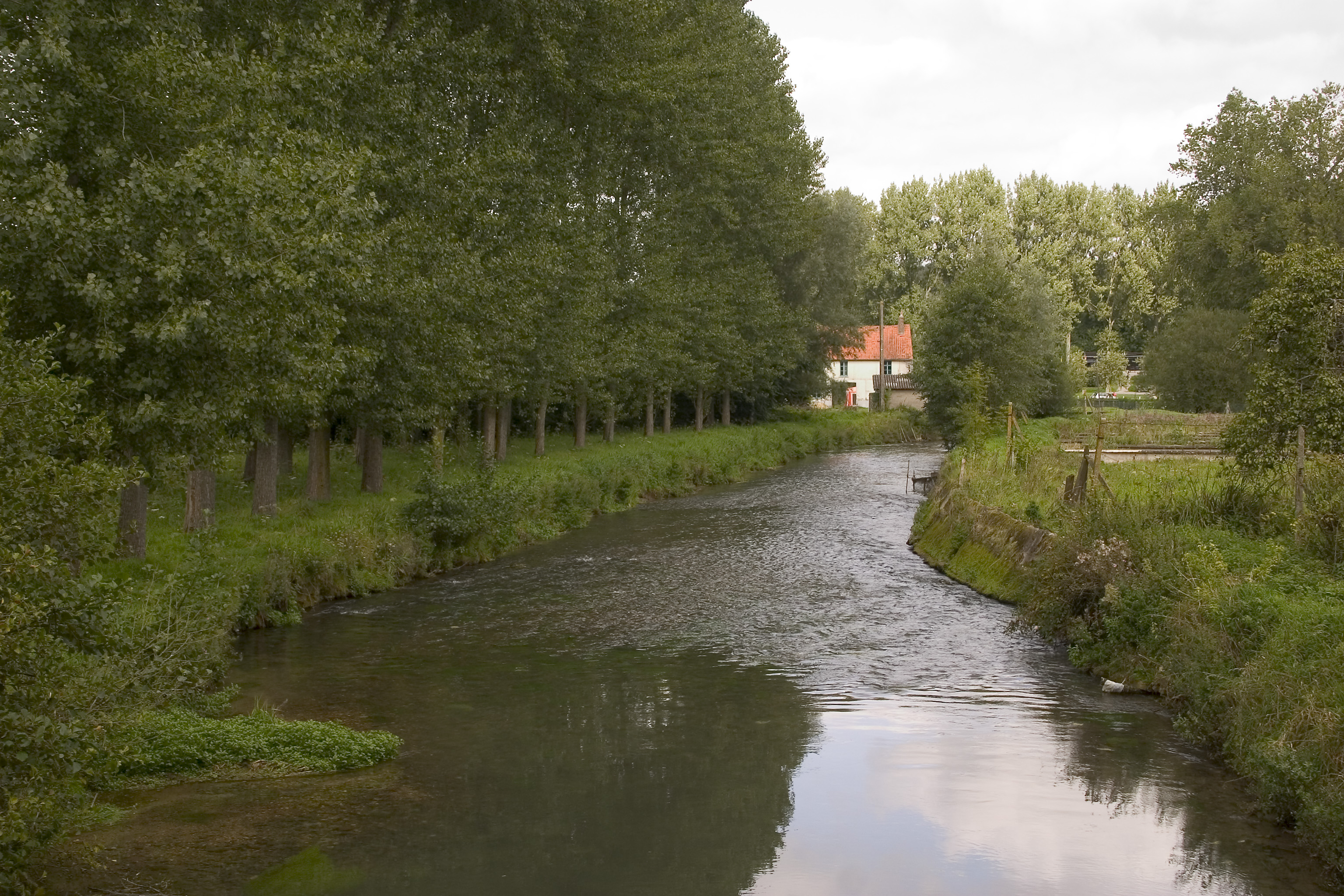
- The Aa at Merck-Saint-Liévin

- Native name: L'Aa (French)

Location
- Country: France

Physical characteristics
- Source
  - location: Bourthes, Pas-de-Calais
- Mouth
  - location: North Sea
  - coordinates: 51°0′21″N 2°6′16″E
- Length: 93 km (58 mi)
- Basin size: 1,215 km^{2} (469 mi^{2})
- Discharge
  - average: 10 m^{3}/s (350 cu ft/s)

The Aa (French pronunciation: [a]; Picard: Abbe) is a river in northern France that is 93 km (58 miles) long. Originating near the village of Bourthes and emptying into the North Sea near Gravelines, the Aa is located near the north-eastern limit of the English Channel. The Aa has been canalized for most of its length and forms much of the border between the regions of Pas-de-Calais and Nord.

== Hydronymy ==
The word "Aa" in Old Dutch means "water" (it still retains the name in modern Dutch and local West Flemish), and can be traced via Proto-Germanic back to its original Indo-European form. The river is very well-known to crossword enthusiasts ("the first river in France"). The river is known in Modern Latin as Agnio, but has been recorded in many forms in Medieval Latin, starting with Agnona in 648 AD. In local Picard dialects, the Aa is traditionally called the Abbe.

== Geography ==
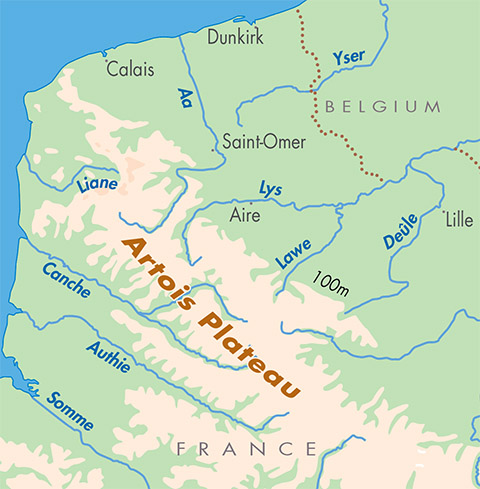
Location of the River Aa to the other rivers of Flanders, before the connecting canals were built

The river's geography is divided into two parts. The first segment ranges from the river's source is in the Artois Hills to Saint-Omer to form a small chalk stream, similar to the Somme. This section of the river drains the Artois plateau and is 56 km (35 miles) long. The river's second part spans from Saint-Omer to its mouth, a distance of approximately 29 kilometres (18 miles). As a navigable waterway, this section connects the Canal de Calais to Calais and the Canal de Bourbourg leading to Dunkirk. The section of the river from Saint-Omer to the junction with the main Dunkirk-Scheldt waterway and the Canal de Neuffossé are not currently navigable.

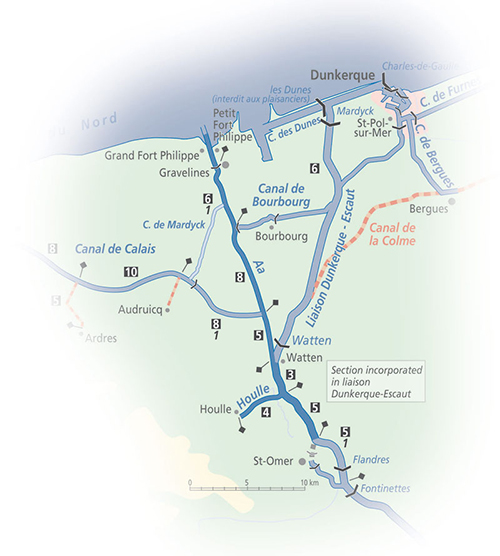
Location of the navigable part of the river Aa and connections with other waterways

== History ==
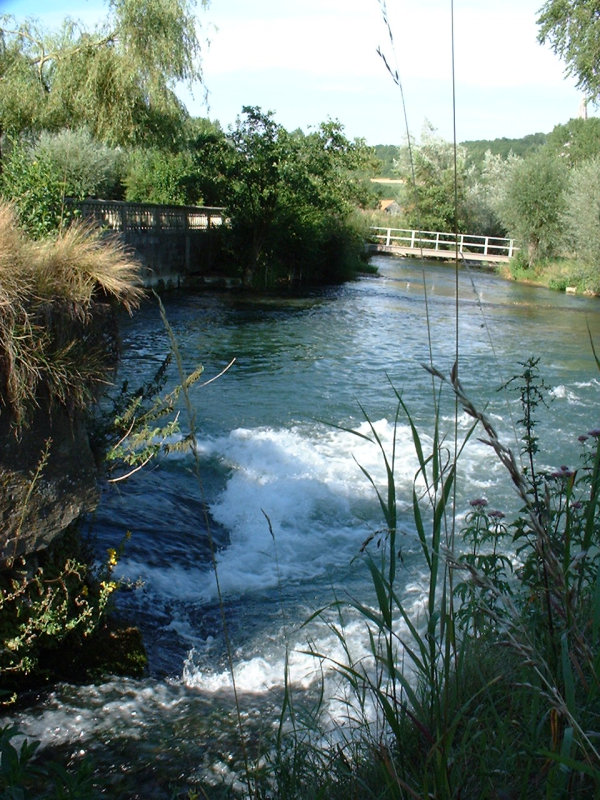

Its name originates from the Old High German word aha, which means water. The word also shares roots with the Latin word aqua. Saint-Omer formerly lay at the head of its estuary while seaward, Calais lay on its western margin and Bergues, now inland from Dunkirk, on its eastern one. By the time of the Viking settlements on this coast, Dunkirk was developing on the dunes, offshore across the estuarine marsh from Bergues. Gravelines was the port at the seaward end of the river after the area of the estuary was reclaimed. The dates of these events are imprecise but the modern pattern was firmly established by 1588, the time of the Spanish Armada when an approximation to the modern course of the lowland river formed the boundary between the Spanish Netherlands and France. The river suffers significant problems from industrial discharge and siltation, which made the length of the Aa from Saint-Omer to the junction with the Dunkirk-Escaut waterway unnavigable since the 1970s.
