= Dunkirk-Scheldt Canal =

Canal in northern France

Canal Dunkerque-Escaut
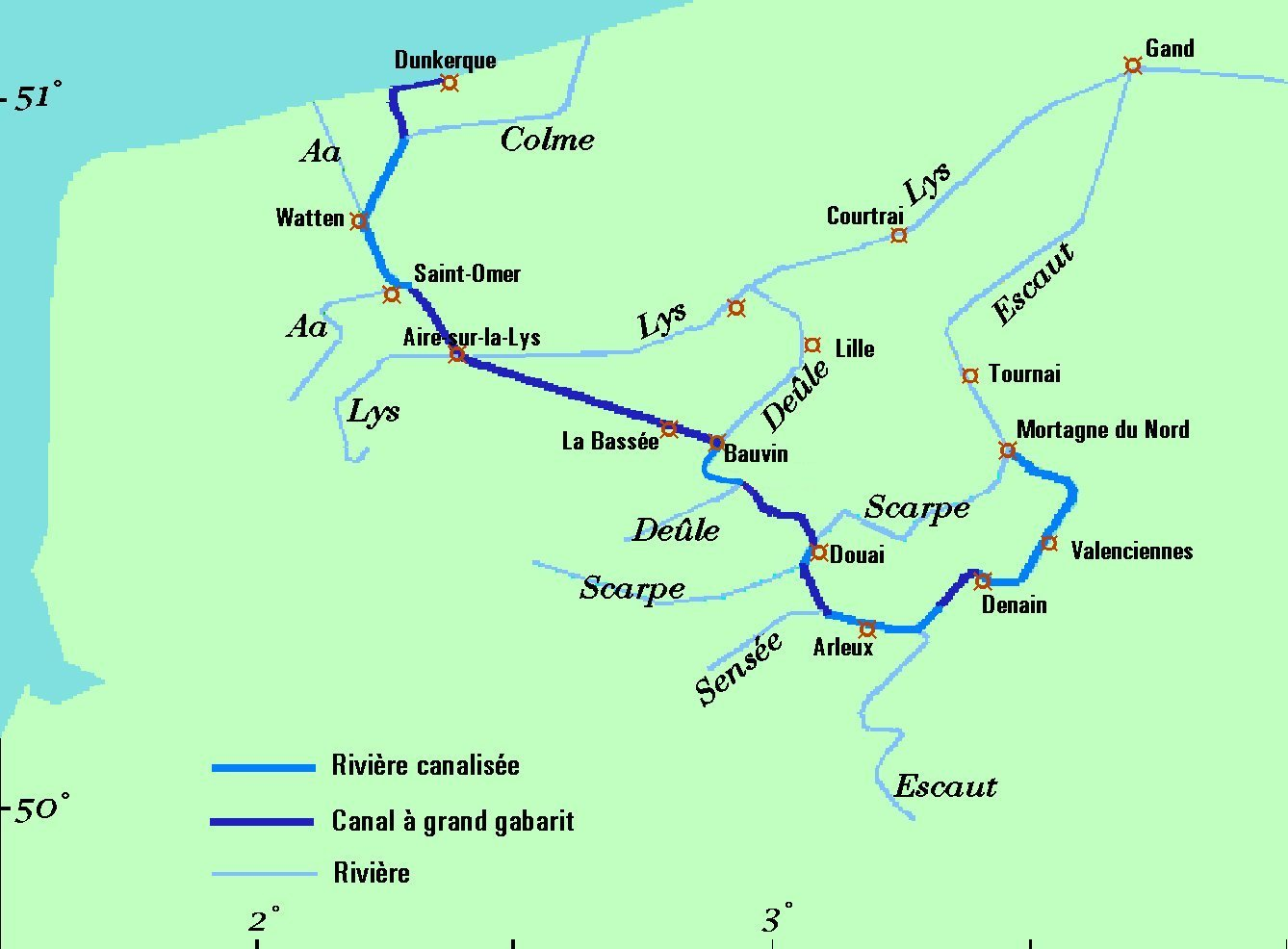
- Map of Dunkirk-Scheldt Waterway
- Interactive map of Canal Dunkerque-Escaut
- Coordinates: 50°31′20″N 2°45′25″E

Specifications
- Length: 189 km (117 mi)
- Lock length: 144.60 m
- Lock width: 12 m
- Maximum boat length: 143 m
- Maximum boat beam: 11.50 m
- Minimum boat draft: 3.00 m
- Minimum boat air draft: 5.25 m
- Locks: 14
- Total rise: 34.90m

Geography
- Start point: Mardyck maritime lock, Port of Dunkerque
- End point: Escaut River
- Beginning coordinates: 51°1′53″N 2°16′2″E
- Ending coordinates: 50°15′40″N 3°17′51″E
- Connects to: Port of Dunkerque - Haut-Escaut in Belgium

The Dunkirk-Scheldt Canal is a 189 km long series of historic canals, and the canalised river Scheldt that were substantially rebuilt from the mid-1950s up to c. 1980, with some new sections, from Dunkirk to the Belgian border at Mortagne-du-Nord. Existing canals (listed below) were straightened and widened; and new locks were built, also on the river Scheldt, from the junction at Bouchain to the border. The route is also known as the Liaison 'à grand gabarit' (large dimensions, or high capacity, literally large gauge) Dunkerque-Escaut. Some authors have separated the waterway into the canal proper and the canalised river Scheldt, but current practice is to use the simple name throughout. The Liaison was designed for large commercial vessels up to 85m long by 11.50m wide (and 143m long push-tows). The entire route is being further upgraded to offer European Class Vb dimensions, for push-tows 185m by 11.50m, and motor barges up to 125m long, as part of the current EU-funded Seine-Scheldt-Rhine waterway corridor investments, including the new Seine-Nord Europe Canal.

== The route ==
The route is made up of nine historically distinct waterways, completed by three new lengths (diversion canals). Starting in the port of Dunkirk, the Mardyck diversion canal connects to the Canal de Bourbourg, which is used for a short length, then the Colme diversion canal leads to the Canal de la Colme, upgraded to Watten where it joins the river Aa from Watten to Arques. The route is then made up of the Canal de Neuffossé from Arques to Aire-sur-la-Lys (PK 113-93), the Canal d'Aire from Aire-sur-la-Lys to Bauvin (PK 93-54), the Canal de la Deûle from Bauvin to Douai (PK 54-32), the Scarpe diversion canal bypassing the narrow river through the town of Douai (PK 32-24), and the Canal de la Sensée from Douai to the junction with the Scheldt at the Bassin Rond in Bouchain. KP 0 on the Liaison is Pont-Malin lock on the Escaut, 500m beyond this junction. The river Scheldt is a further 46 km from the lock to the border.

The Canal de la Deûle is also a high-capacity waterway, developed and named as a branch of the Liaison Dunkerque-Escaut from Bauvin to the river Lys, but current practice is to use the historic name (or just "Deûle") and to consider it as a separate waterway.

The section using the Canal de la Sensée comprises the junction with the Canal du Nord and the projected Seine-Nord Europe Canal, which would replace the former canal completed in 1965 to European Class II dimensions.

== See also ==
List of canals in France
