= Sensée =

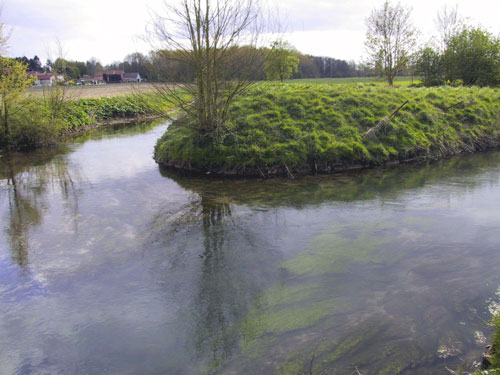
- The Sensée near Remy

- Location within France Location within Hauts-de-France

Location
- Country: France
- Region: Hauts-de-France

Physical characteristics
- Source
  - location: Picardie
  - elevation: 111 m (364 ft)
- Mouth
  - location: Scheldt
  - coordinates: 50°16′46″N 3°18′38″E
- Length: 47 km (29 mi)
- Basin size: 725 km^{2} (280 sq mi)

Basin features
- Progression: Scheldt→ North Sea

The Sensée (French pronunciation: [sɑ̃se]; Picard: Sinsée) is a river in northern France that crosses the département of Pas-de-Calais. The source is found at Croisilles and passes through Lécluse. It crosses the Canal du Nord at Arleux, and joins the canalized Escaut at Bouchain. The average descent is 2.42%. It is 47 km (29 mi) long: 27 km (17 mi) upstream of the Canal du Nord, and 20 km (12 mi) downstream of the Canal du Nord.

The Sensée has many tributaries: the Cojeul, the Trinquise, the Hirondelle, the Agache and the Naville Tortue.

A 10th-century document refers to the river by the name of Sensada. The origins of the name are unknown.

== See also ==
- Canal de la Sensée
