= Bassin Rond =

French pond

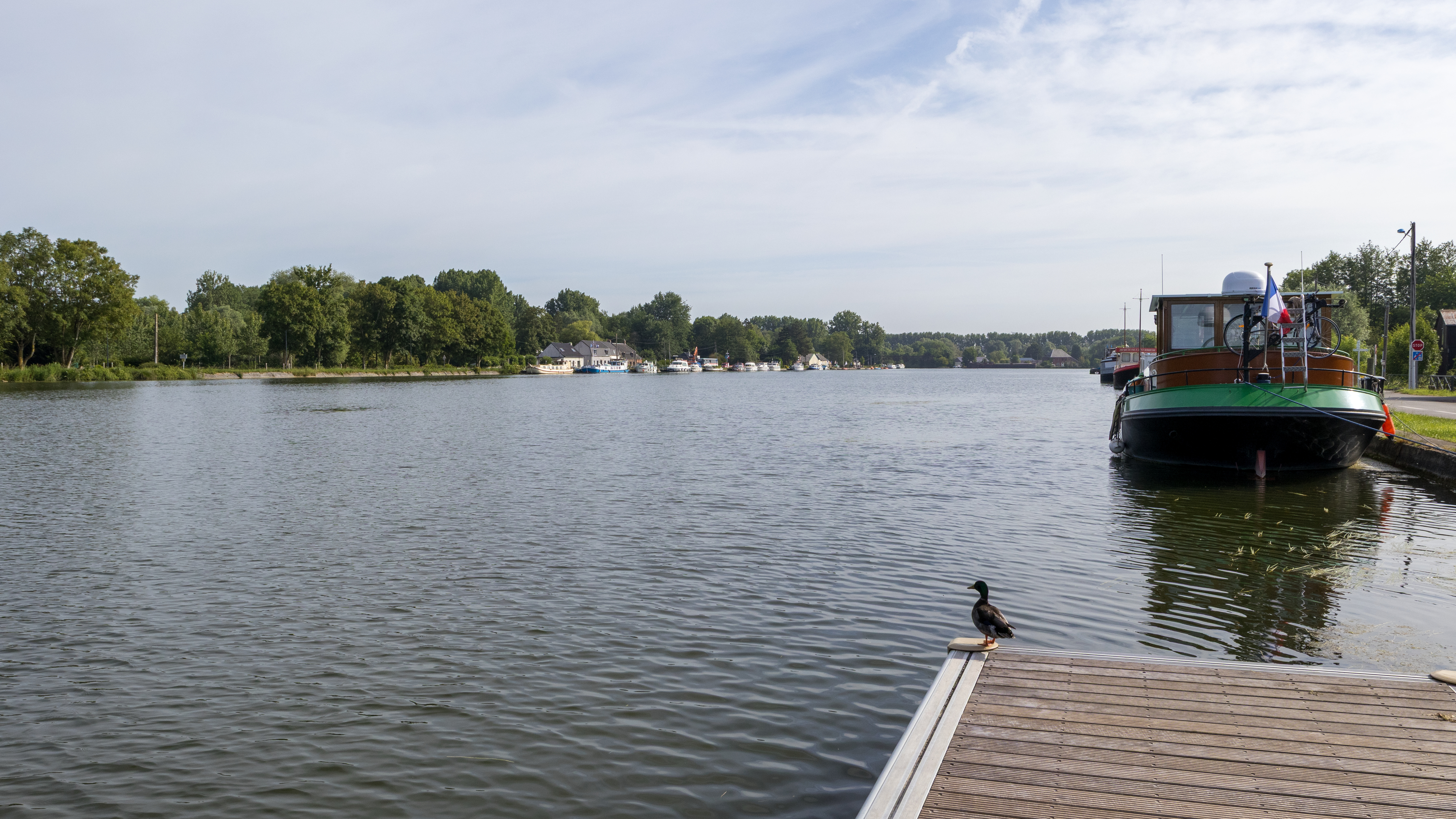
- The Bassin Rond

- Location within France
- Coordinates: 50.25286°N 3.29435°E
- Settlements: Estrun

The Bassin Rond is a pond located beside the Canal de la Sensée as it joins the Canal de l'Escaut near Estrun, France.
