= Lerond =

Lerond or Le Rond is a surname. Notable people with the surname include:

- André Lerond (1930–2018), French footballer
- Justine Lerond (born 2000), French footballer
- Henri Le Rond (1864–1949), French general

== See also ==
- Jean le Rond d'Alembert, French mathematician
