= Scarpe (river) =

River in France

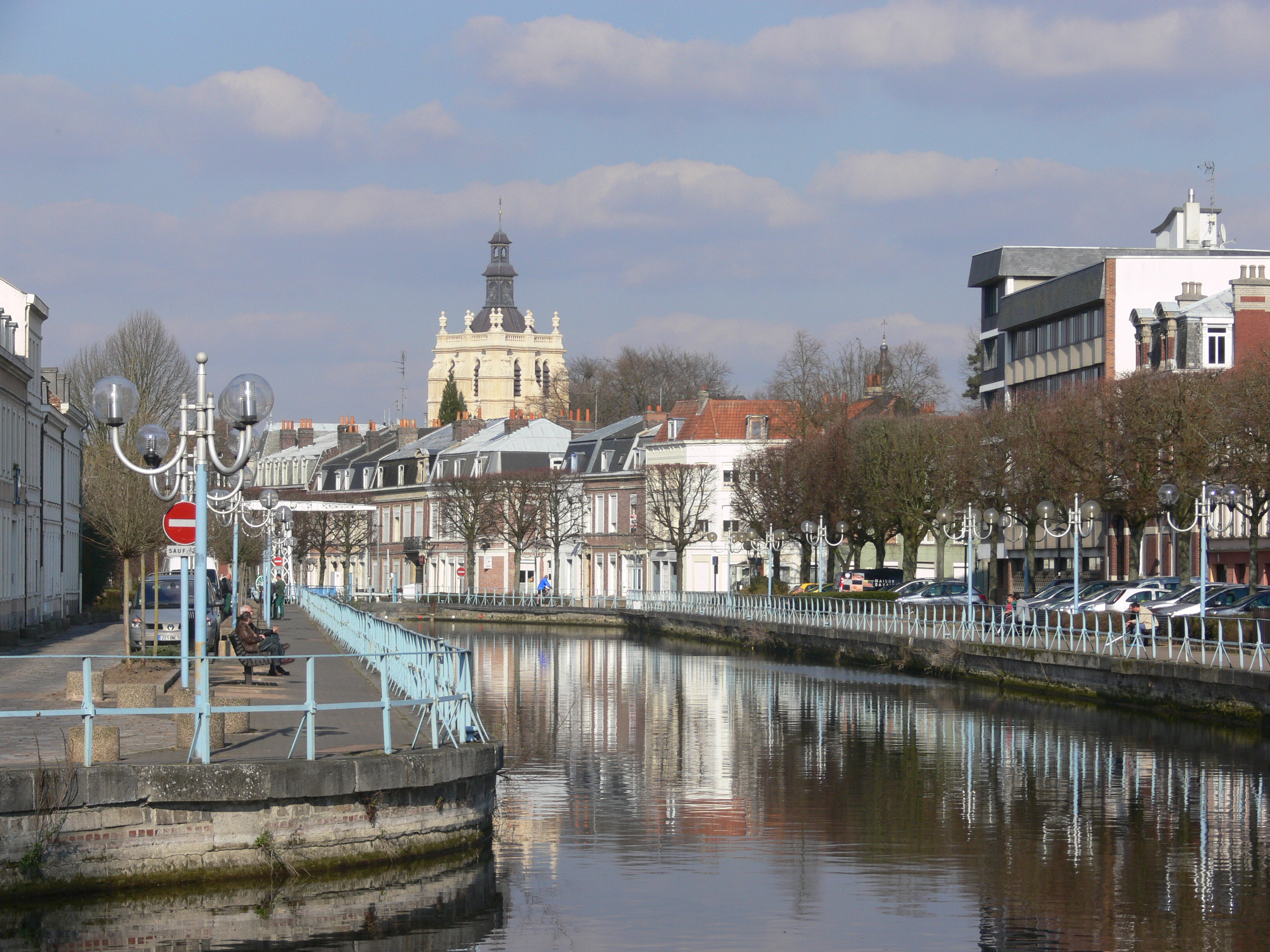
- The Scarpe at Douai

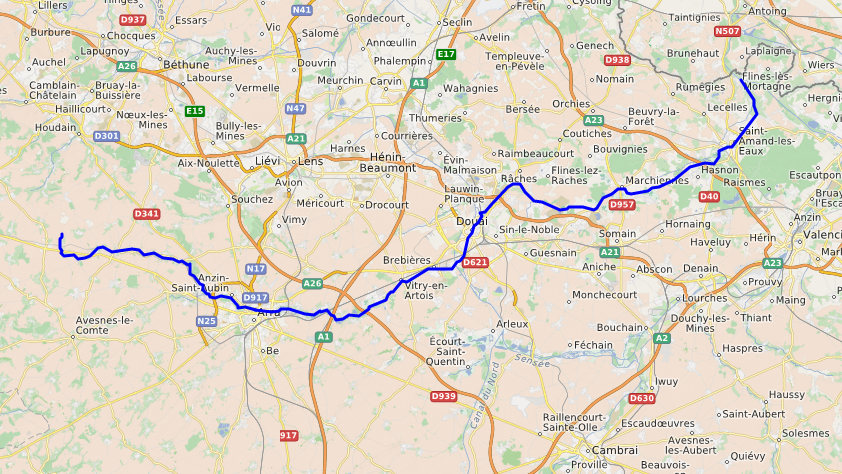

Location
- Country: France

Physical characteristics
- Source
  - location: Pas-de-Calais
  - elevation: 101 m (331 ft)
- Mouth
  - location: Scheldt
  - coordinates: 50°29′59″N 3°26′49″E
- Length: 94 km (58 mi)
- Basin size: 1,322 km^{2} (510 mi^{2})

Basin features
- Progression: Scheldt→ North Sea

Ramsar Wetland
- Official name: Vallées de la Scarpe et de l'Escaut
- Designated: 2 February 2020
- Reference no.: 2405

The Scarpe (French pronunciation: [skaʁp]) is a river in the Hauts-de-France region of France. It is a is 94 km (58 mi) long left-bank tributary of the river Escaut (Scheldt). The source of the river is at Berles-Monchel near Aubigny-en-Artois. It flows through the towns of Arras, Douai and Saint-Amand-les-Eaux. The river ends at Mortagne-du-Nord, where it flows into the Scheldt. Scarpe Mountain in Alberta, Canada, was named after the river. The navigable waterway and its coal barges also feature in the novels by the 19th-century author Émile Zola.

== Navigation ==
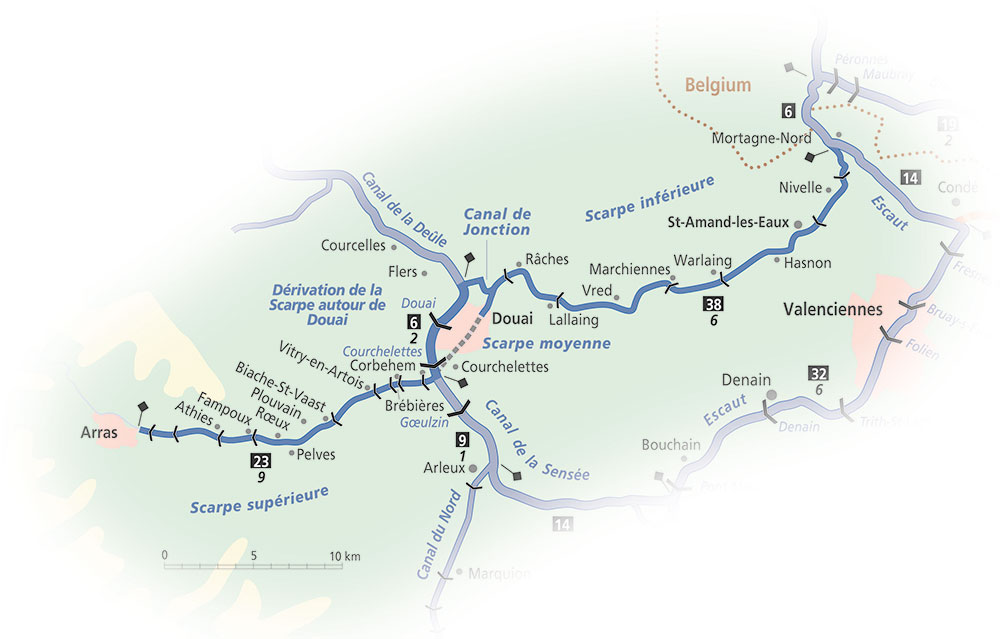
River Scarpe and connecting waterways (not showing the non-navigable stream west from Arras)

The river was made navigable by 15 weirs and locks over about two thirds of its length (67 km (42 mi)), divided into the Upper Scarpe (Scarpe supérieure, 23 km, 9 locks) from Arras to Courchelettes, the Middle Scarpe through Douai, and the Lower Scarpe (Scarpe inférieure, 36 km, 6 locks) from Douai to the Escaut. The Middle Scarpe is no longer navigable, bypassed by the high-capacity Canal Dunkerque-Escaut.

== History ==
This river was navigated from the Escaut up to Douai as early as 638, but improvements with flash locks were required to give access to the important town of Arras, reached in 1613. This remained a shallow navigation, with locks of varying width and length, until it was improved to the Becquey gauge in the 1840s. The enlargement to Freycinet gauge was completed by about 1890. Today the Lower Scarpe is closed from the Douai junction to Saint-Amand-les-Eaux pending dredging and identification of a new owner and operator.

The river and its valley were important battlegrounds in the Battle of the Scarpe in the First World War. The valley of the Scarpe has been designated as a protected Ramsar site since 2020.
