= Aire-sur-la-Lys =

Aire-sur-la-Lys Ariën-aan-de-Leie (West Flemish)
- Commune
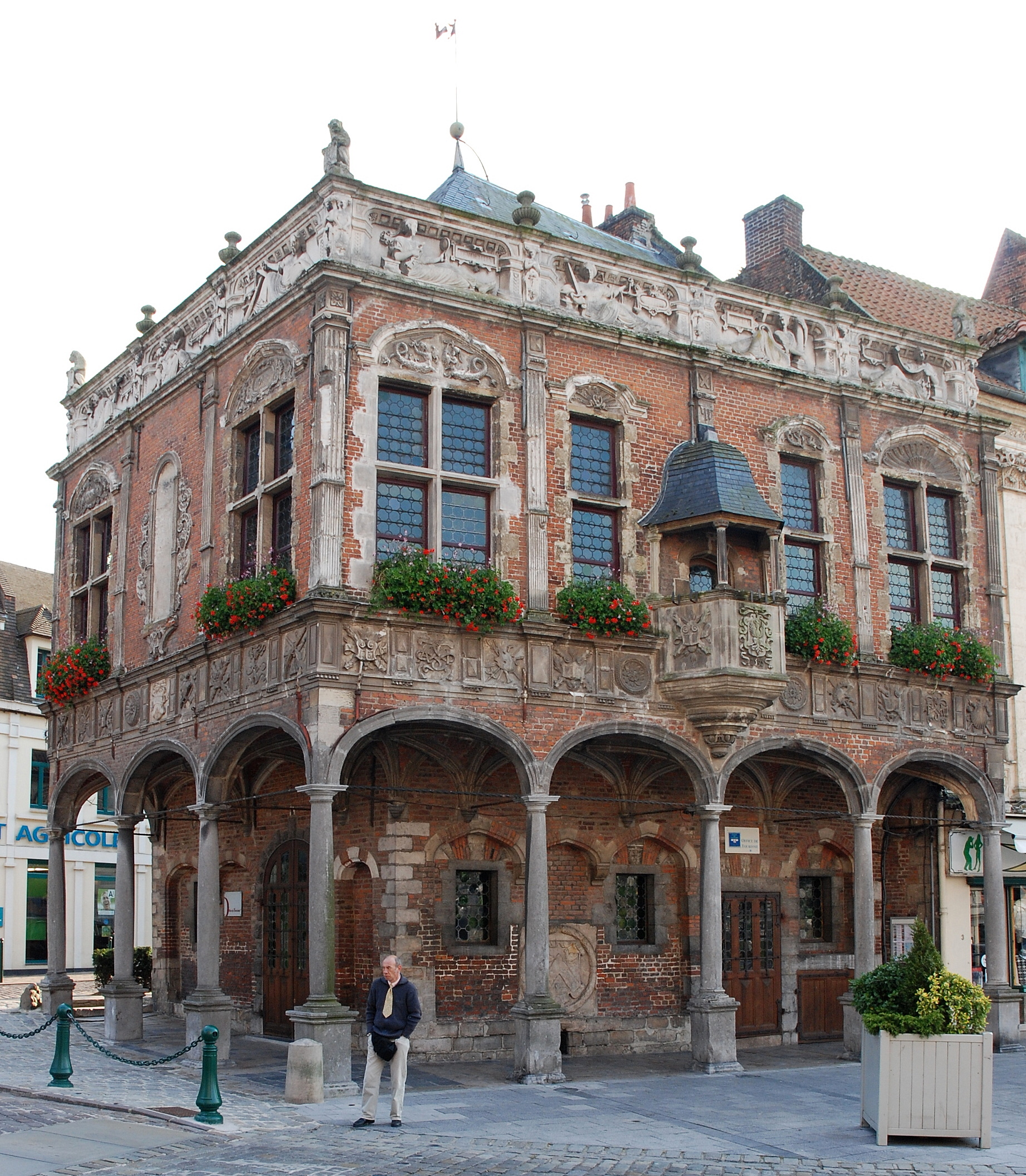
- The former bailiff's office

- Coat of arms
- Location of Aire-sur-la-Lys
- Location within France Location within Hauts-de-France
- Coordinates: 50°38′N 2°24′E
- Country: France
- Region: Hauts-de-France
- Department: Pas-de-Calais
- Arrondissement: Saint-Omer
- Canton: Aire-sur-la-Lys
- Intercommunality: Pays de Saint-Omer

Government
  - Mayor (2020–2026): Jean-Claude Dissaux
- Area^{1}: 33.38 km^{2} (12.89 sq mi)
- Elevation: 22 m (72 ft)
- Highest elevation: 48 m (157 ft)
- Lowest elevation: 16 m (52 ft)
- Population (2023): 9,598
  - Density: 287.5/km^{2} (744.7/sq mi)
- Time zone: UTC+01:00 (CET)
  - Summer (DST): UTC+02:00 (CEST)
- INSEE/Postal code: 62014 /62120
- Website: Official website
- ^{1} French Land Register data, which excludes lakes, ponds, glaciers > 1 km^{2} (0.386 sq mi or 247 acres) and river estuaries.

Aire-sur-la-Lys (French: [ɛːʁ syʁ la lis]; West Flemish: Ariën-aan-de-Leie; literally "Aire on the Lys") is a commune in the Pas-de-Calais department in northern France.

== Geography ==
The commune is located 16 kilometres (10 mi) southeast of Saint-Omer, at the junction of the N43 with several departmental roads, by the banks of the Leie (French: Lys) and the Laquette rivers.

== History ==
Aire-sur-la-Lys is mentioned for the first time in 857. It developed around a fort or castrum built by Baldwin II, Count of Flanders in response to the Norman invasions. More growth followed with the establishment of the Collegiate church of Saint-Pierre by Baldwin V, Count of Flanders.

The town was laid siege ten times between 1127 and 1710. It was separated from the County of Flanders and attached to the County of Artois in 1196. Subsequently, ruled by the Burgundians then by the Spanish and Austrian Habsburgs.

The town was besieged in 1676 by Vauban and retaken for France, although it remained a Habsburg possession until 14 April 1713, when, by the Treaty of Utrecht, it finally became a part of France.

Vauban’s stronghold, which was a strategic position, was dismantled in 1893.

== Population ==
Historical population
Year	Pop.	±% p.a.
1968	9,179	—
1975	9,184	+0.01%
1982	9,535	+0.54%
1990	9,529	−0.01%
1999	9,661	+0.15%
2007	9,645	−0.02%
2012	10,006	+0.74%
2017	9,871	−0.27%
2023	9,598	−0.47%
Source: INSEE

== Sights ==
=== Collegiate Church of Saint-Pierre ===
The church is one of the most important monuments, with its imposing style, in Artois. It has all the characteristics of a cathedral, but in the absence of a bishop, it cannot claim that title. Witness to the splendour of the city, the collegiate church of Saint-Pierre is of Romanesque style. Built between 1492 and the eighteenth century, one can see both on the inside and the outside of the building carving that details the 400 years progress. It has been the parish church since 1802. The tower, completed in 1624, collapsed soon after. Ten years later, the damage was repaired. The top of the tower was again restored between May 2005 and April 2007. The ground floor, the nave, choir and high arches are essentially Gothic.

The dimensions of the building are impressive:

- Total external length: 105 metres
- Total external width: 40 metres
- Width of the central nave: 10 metres
- Height of the tower: 66 metres

It was classified a historical monument in 1862.

=== Le Bailliage ===
A Flemish Renaissance style building which was built between 1595 and 1600, as guardrooms for the militia of the city. It is commonly known as Le Bailliage (The Bailiwick), because at various times between 1634 and 1789, it served as the seat of the court bailiffs. In 1595, the mayor, one Jacques de Caverel had obtained permission from Brussels to raise taxes on beer and wine for the construction of the guardhouse on the city marketplace and the monument was inaugurated on 22 November 1600. The building itself is an irregular quadrilateral of 125m square, with 3 facades giving out onto the Grande Place, Rue d’Arras and what was then the Rue des Cuisiniers. The architect, Pierre Framery was inspired by the former Hotel de Ville at Amsterdam. Many restorations have been necessary over the centuries. The Bailliage has undergone various uses: guardhouse, courthouse, Town Hall and police headquarters in the 19th and 20th centuries. Since 1970, it has been the Tourist Office. The large room upstairs is used for exhibitions. The Bailiwick has been classified as an historic monument since 1886.

=== Hôtel de Ville ===
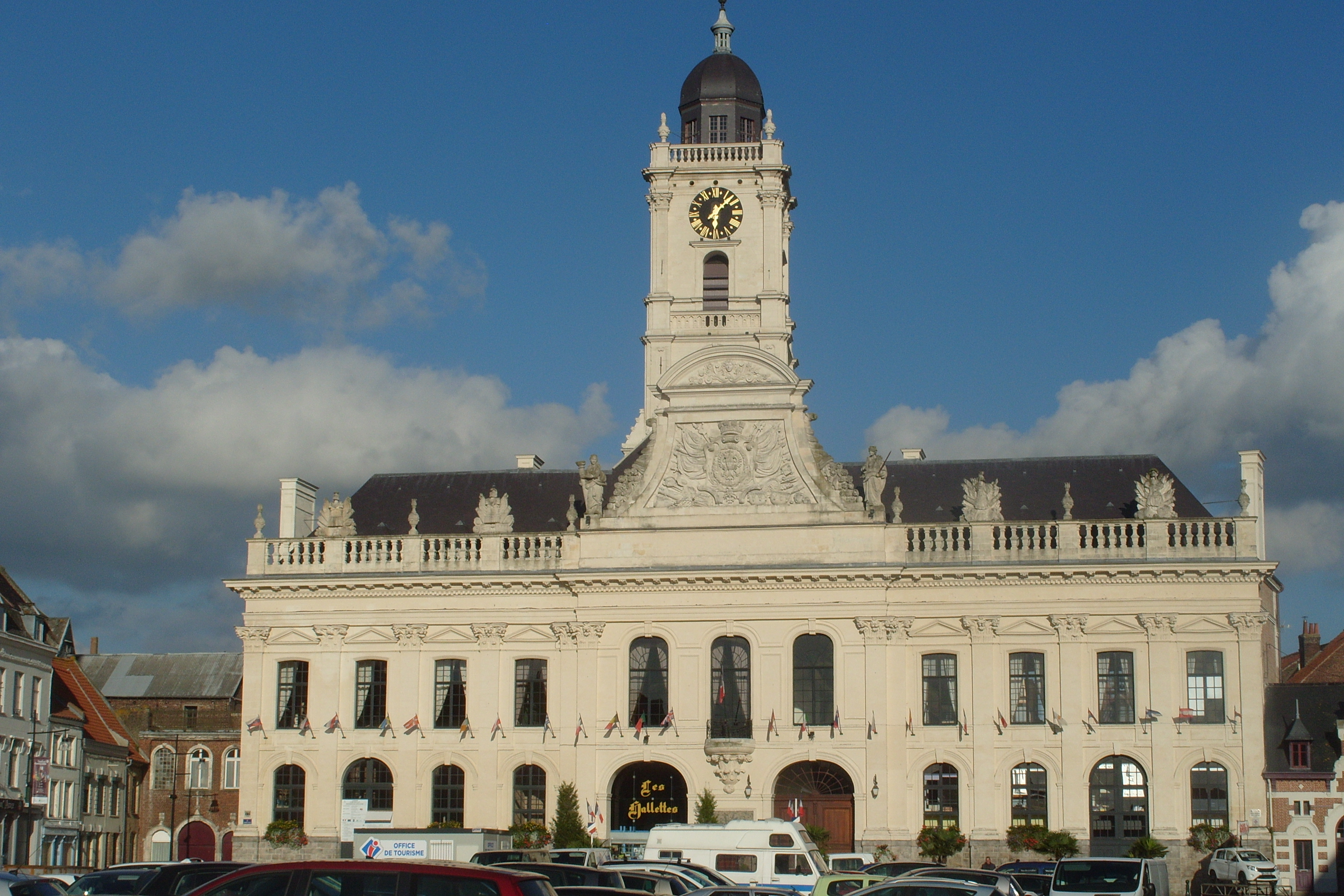
The Hôtel de Ville

After the return of Aire to the kingdom of France by the Treaty of Utrecht in 1713, King Louis XIV gave permission to build a new and more prestigious Hôtel de Ville (Town Hall), in recognition of the suffering of the city during the siege of 1710 under Dutch occupation.

=== Other historic buildings ===
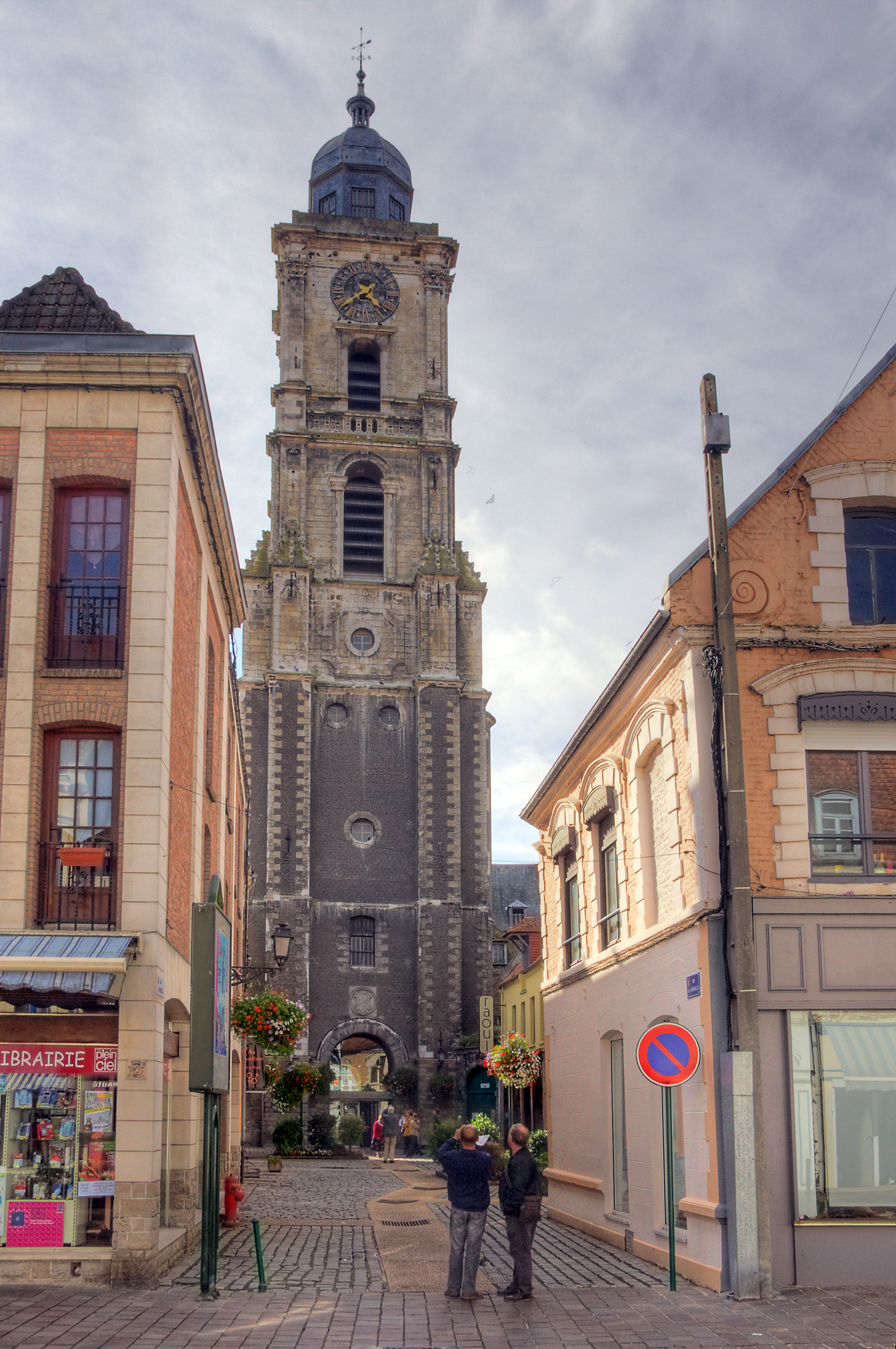
The Bell-tower, classified as World Heritage Site by UNESCO in 2005

- The Bell-tower, classified as World Heritage Site by UNESCO (as part of the Belfries of Belgium and France) in 2005, in recognition of its architecture and historical importance to municipal power in the region. It was rebuilt in 1923 at the same time as the City Hall after a fire in 1914.
- Chapel of Saint-Jacques, a former Jesuit college, built by Jean Beegrand between 1682 and 1688.
- Abbey of Saint-Augustin-de-Clarques.
- The former Governor's residence.
- The old Lys brewery – interesting facades and roofs of the brewing and malting workshop and the former stables.
- Old city gates to Arras and Saint-Omer.
- Bastion of Beaulieu Chenal the canal entrance protected by a cofferdam.
- The Taix and Listenois cavalry barracks.
- The Beaudelle chapel - Listed facade and roof.
- Church of Saint-Jacques-le-Maggiore and St. Ignatius:
- Church of Saint-Pierre:
- Church of Saint-Quentin
- Fort St. Francis (also called High Gassion), with some above-ground remains visible and underground remains of fortifications
- Hospital / Hospice of Saint-Jean.

== Personalities ==
- Michault Taillevent (Michault le Caron), 15th century poet
- Jean Berrier (1766–1824), journalist and playwright
- René Goblet (1828–1905), politician and Prime Minister of France
- Guyart des Moulins, medieval churchman

== International relations ==
The commune is twinned with: Menden, Germany
Sturry, England
Fordwich, England
Flint, Wales

== See also ==
- Canal d'Aire
- Communes of the Pas-de-Calais department
