= Bergues Canal =

Canal in France

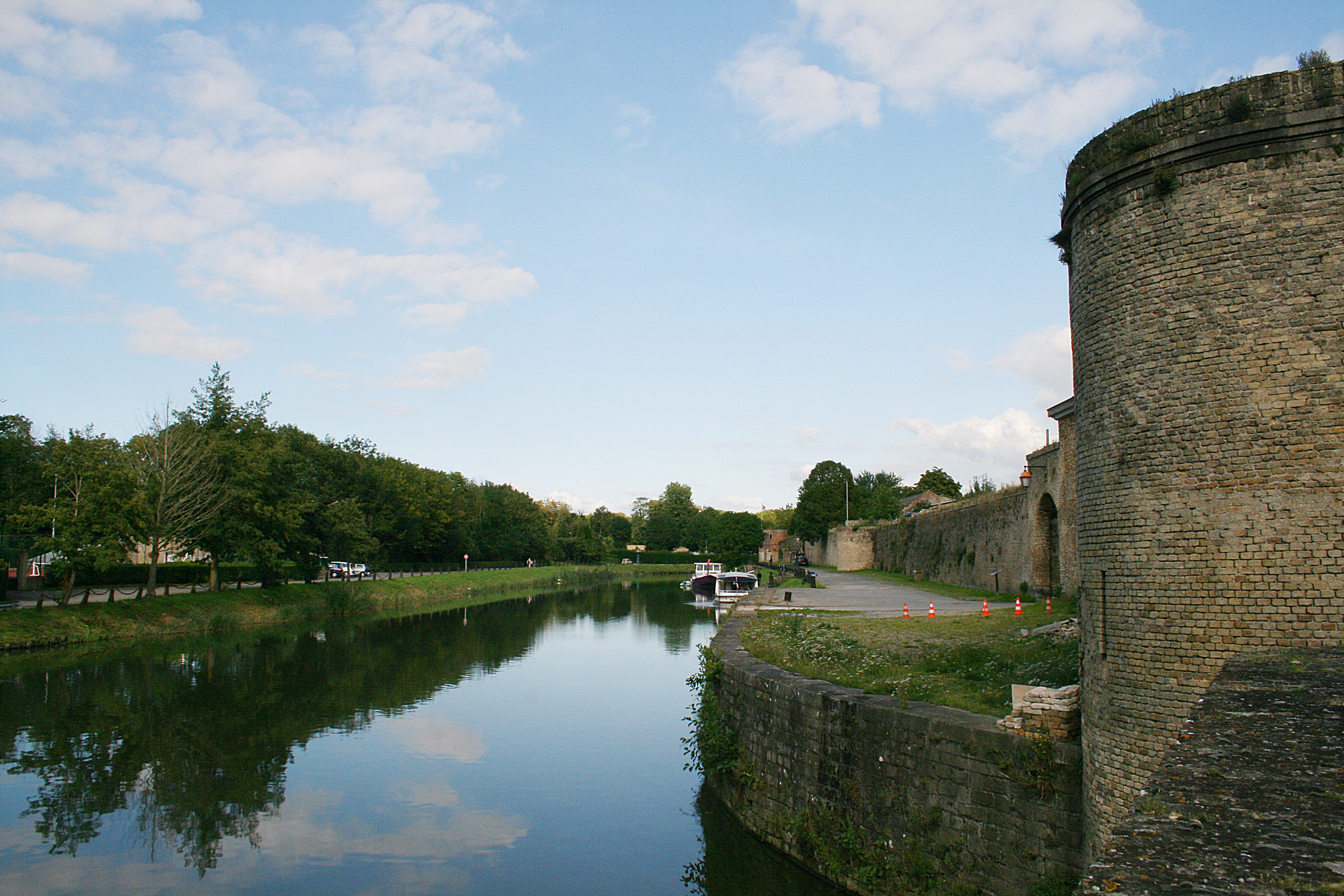
The Bergues canal and its port at the foot of the ramparts of the city of Bergues

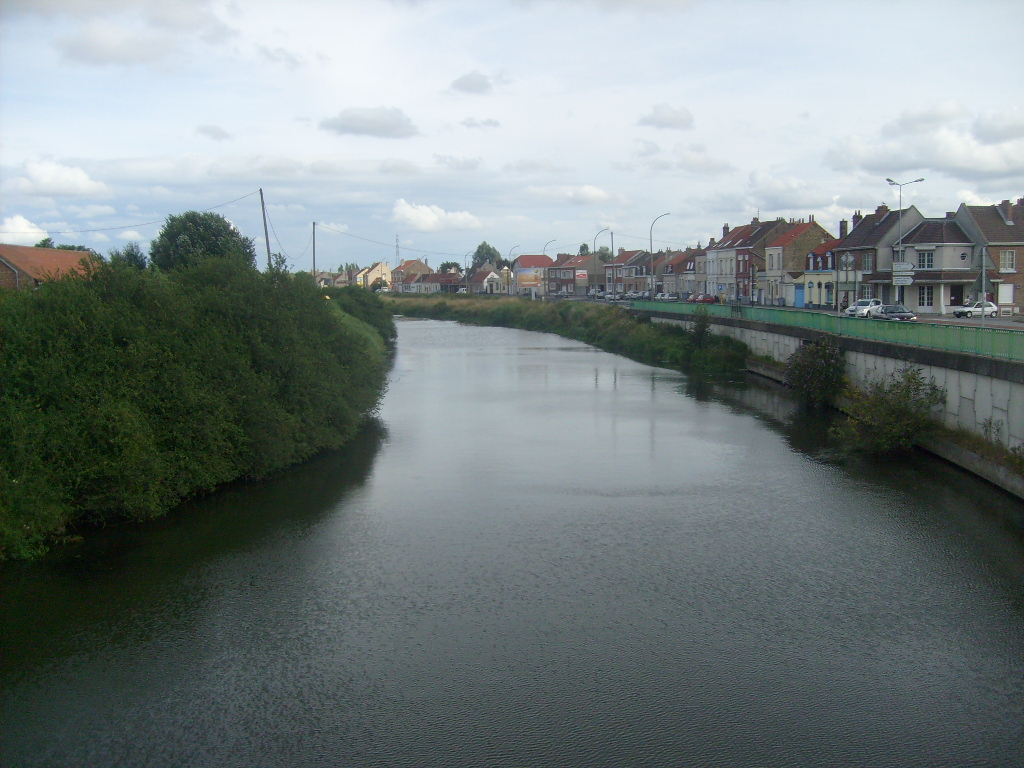
Canal de Bergues

The Canal de Bergues (French pronunciation: [kanal də bɛʁɡ]) is one of the oldest canals in Flanders, its course being shown on a map dating from the 9th century, connecting Bergues to the port of Dunkerque, in northern France. The town itself, heavily fortified by Vauban in the late 17th century, is the main attraction for boats, which moor in a dramatic location just outside the fortified walls. Commercial traffic ceased in the 1970s. The site acquired worldwide fame in 2008 as the location for the cult film Bienvenue chez les Ch'tis. The local Ch'ti dialect and out-of-tune belfry chimes contributed to making the town a destination for tourists. The canal formerly connected with the Canal de la Basse-Colme heading west to Veurne via the Bergenvaart, and the Canal de la Haute-Colme west to the Canal Dunkerque-Escaut at Lynck. Restoration of these canals would greatly increase the tourism potential of Bergues, but there is opposition from the authority managing the local drainage canals. Bergues remains a there-and-back excursion for visiting boats.

== See also ==
- List of canals in France
