= Janville, Oise =

Commune in France

Janville
- Commune
- Location of Janville
- Location within France Location within Hauts-de-France
- Coordinates: 49°27′21″N 2°51′39″E
- Country: France
- Region: Hauts-de-France
- Department: Oise
- Arrondissement: Compiègne
- Canton: Compiègne-1
- Intercommunality: CA Région de Compiègne et Basse Automne

Government
  - Mayor (2020–2026): Philippe Boucher
- Area^{1}: 0.9 km^{2} (0.35 sq mi)
- Highest elevation: 138 m (453 ft)
- Lowest elevation: 32 m (105 ft)
- Population (2023): 640
  - Density: 710/km^{2} (1,800/sq mi)
- Time zone: UTC+01:00 (CET)
  - Summer (DST): UTC+02:00 (CEST)
- INSEE/Postal code: 60323 /60150
- ^{1} French Land Register data, which excludes lakes, ponds, glaciers > 1 km^{2} (0.386 sq mi or 247 acres) and river estuaries.

Janville (French pronunciation: [ʒɑ̃vil]) is a commune in the Oise department in northern France.

== See also ==
- Communes of the Oise department
