= Voies navigables de France =

French navigation authority

- Abbreviation: VNF
- Predecessor: Office national de la Navigation
- Formation: 1991; 35 years ago
- Headquarters: 175 Rue Ludovic Boutleux; 62400 Béthune
- President: Laurent Hénart
- Director general: Thierry Guimbaud
- Staff: 4,000
- Website: www.vnf.fr

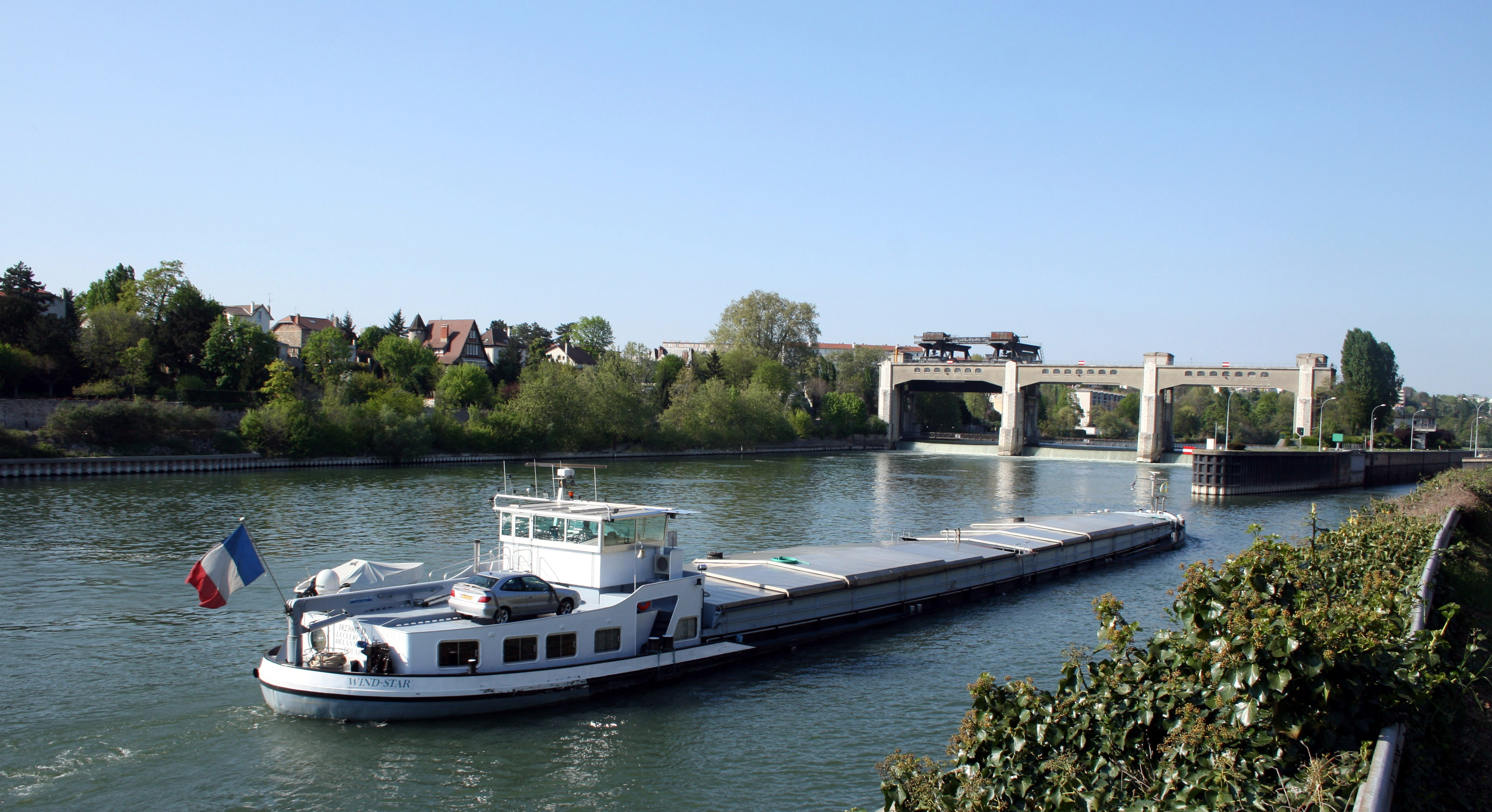
A barge on the River Seine, one of the waterways managed by VNF.

Voies navigables de France (French pronunciation: [vwa naviɡabl də fʁɑ̃s]; VNF, English: Navigable Waterways of France) is the French navigation authority responsible for the management of the majority of France's inland waterways network and the associated facilities—towpaths, commercial and leisure ports, lock-keeper's houses and other structures.

VNF was established in 1991 and took over the responsibility for all waterways from the National Office of Navigation (French: Office National de la Navigation) in 1993. It is a public body and is under the control of the Minister of Ecology, Energy, Sustainable Development and Territorial Development (French: Ministère de l'Écologie, de l'Energie, du Développement durable et de l'Aménagement du territoire). The headquarters of VNF are in Béthune, Pas-de-Calais with local offices throughout France.

== French waterways network ==
The French natural and man-made waterways network is the largest in Europe extending to over 8,500-kilometre (5,300 mi) of which VNF manages the navigable sections. The assets managed by VNF comprise 6,700-kilometre (4,200 mi) of waterways, made up of 3,800-kilometre (2,400 mi) of canals and 2,900-kilometre (1,800 mi) of navigable rivers, 494 dams, 1595 locks, 74 aqueducts, 65 reservoirs, 35 tunnels and a land area of 800 km^{2} (310 sq mi).

Two significant waterways which are not under VNF's control are the navigable sections of the River Somme and the Brittany Canals, which are both under local management, and neither is the River Lot in Aquitaine.

=== Enhancements ===
Approximately 20% of the network is suitable for commercial boats of over 1000 tonnes and the VNF has an ongoing programme of maintenance and modernisation to increase depth of waterways, widths of locks and headroom under bridges to support France's strategy of encouraging freight onto water as part of her sustainable development programme—a survey by Price Waterhouse Coopers showed that 75% of French companies were willing to switch to barge transport.

A major current initiative is the cross-border Seine–Nord Europe Canal project, connecting the Seine and the Scheldt, which will provide a continuous wide-gauge navigation from Le Havre to Antwerp.

== See also ==
- List of rivers of France
- List of canals in France
