= Bauvin =

- Commune
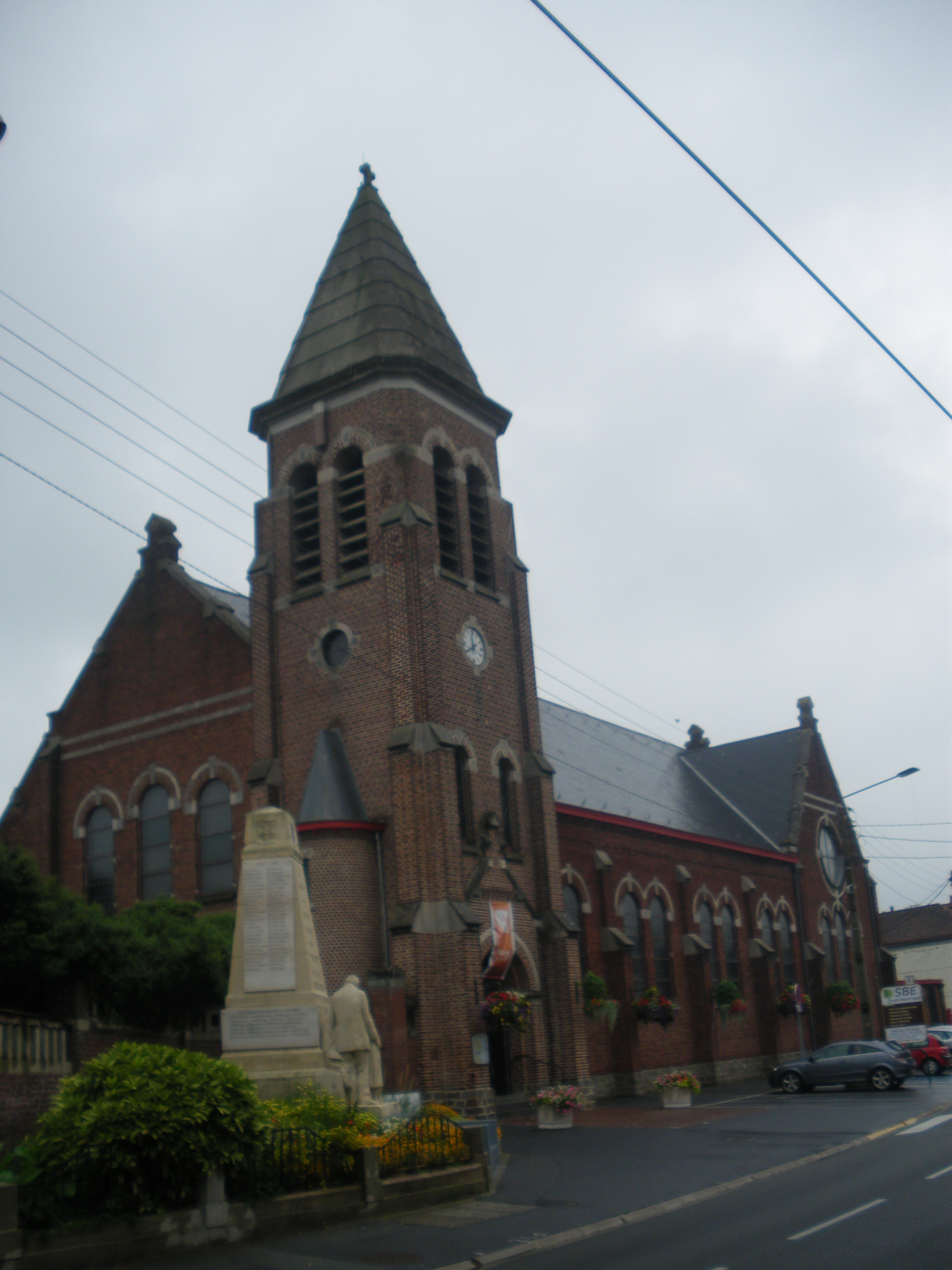
- The church in Bauvin

- Coat of arms
- Location of Bauvin
- Location within France Location within Hauts-de-France
- Coordinates: 50°30′54″N 2°53′56″E
- Country: France
- Region: Hauts-de-France
- Department: Nord
- Arrondissement: Lille
- Canton: Annœullin
- Intercommunality: Métropole Européenne de Lille

Government
  - Mayor (2020–2026): Louis-Pascal Lebargy
- Area^{1}: 3.85 km^{2} (1.49 sq mi)
- Elevation: 30 m (98 ft)
- Highest elevation: 32 m (105 ft)
- Lowest elevation: 18 m (59 ft)
- Population (2023): 5,249
  - Density: 1,360/km^{2} (3,530/sq mi)
- Time zone: UTC+01:00 (CET)
  - Summer (DST): UTC+02:00 (CEST)
- INSEE/Postal code: 59052 /59221
- ^{1} French Land Register data, which excludes lakes, ponds, glaciers > 1 km^{2} (0.386 sq mi or 247 acres) and river estuaries.

Bauvin (French pronunciation: [bovɛ̃]) is a commune in the Nord department in northern France.

It is 17 km (11 mi) southwest of Lille.

== Population ==
Historical population

Year	Pop.	±% p.a.
1793	724	—
1800	709	−0.30%
1806	817	+2.39%
1821	963	+1.10%
1831	970	+0.07%
1836	972	+0.04%
1841	1,083	+2.19%
1846	1,168	+1.52%
1851	1,233	+1.09%
1856	1,326	+1.46%
1861	1,731	+5.48%
1866	1,922	+2.12%
1872	1,854	−0.60%
1876	1,907	+0.71%
1881	1,998	+0.94%
1886	2,172	+1.68%
1891	2,284	+1.01%
1896	2,398	+0.98%
1901	2,620	+1.79%

Year	Pop.	±% p.a.
1906	2,932	+2.28%
1911	3,093	+1.07%
1921	2,536	−1.97%
1926	3,253	+5.11%
1931	3,399	+0.88%
1936	3,478	+0.46%
1946	3,746	+0.75%
1954	4,006	+0.84%
1962	4,018	+0.04%
1968	3,972	−0.19%
1975	3,835	−0.50%
1982	4,356	+1.84%
1990	5,444	+2.83%
1999	5,338	−0.22%
2007	5,318	−0.05%
2012	5,288	−0.11%
2017	5,180	−0.41%
2023	5,249	+0.22%

Source: EHESS and INSEE (1968-2023)

== Heraldry ==
Arms of Bauvin	The arms of Bauvin are blazoned : Or, a cross moline gules. (Annœullin, Bauvin and Mons-en-Pévèle use the same arms.)

== See also ==
- Communes of the Nord department
