= 43rd (Howitzer) Brigade, Royal Field Artillery =

XLIII (Howitzer) Brigade, RFA
- Royal Artillery cap badge
- Active: 1900–13; 1913–16; 1917–19
- Country: United Kingdom
- Branch: British Army
- Role: Field artillery
- Size: 2–3 Batteries
- Part of: 1st Division; 67th (2nd Home Counties) Division
- Engagements: Battle of Mons; First Battle of the Aisne; First Battle of Ypres; Battle of Neuve Chapelle; Second Battle of Ypres; Battle of Aubers Ridge; Battle of Festubert; Second Action at Givenchy; Battle of Loos

Commanders
- Notable commanders: Lt-Col Frederick Leonard Sharp

XLIII (Howitzer) Brigade (43rd (Howitzer) Brigade) was a unit of Britain's Royal Field Artillery from 1900 until 1919. After serving in India it returned to the UK, where it underwent several reorganisations. It served with 1st Divisional Artillery on the Western Front during the first two years of World War I, including the Battles of Mons, Ypres, and Loos before being broken up. It reformed as a field gun brigade in home defence in 1917 but was disbanded after the Armistice.

== Origin ==
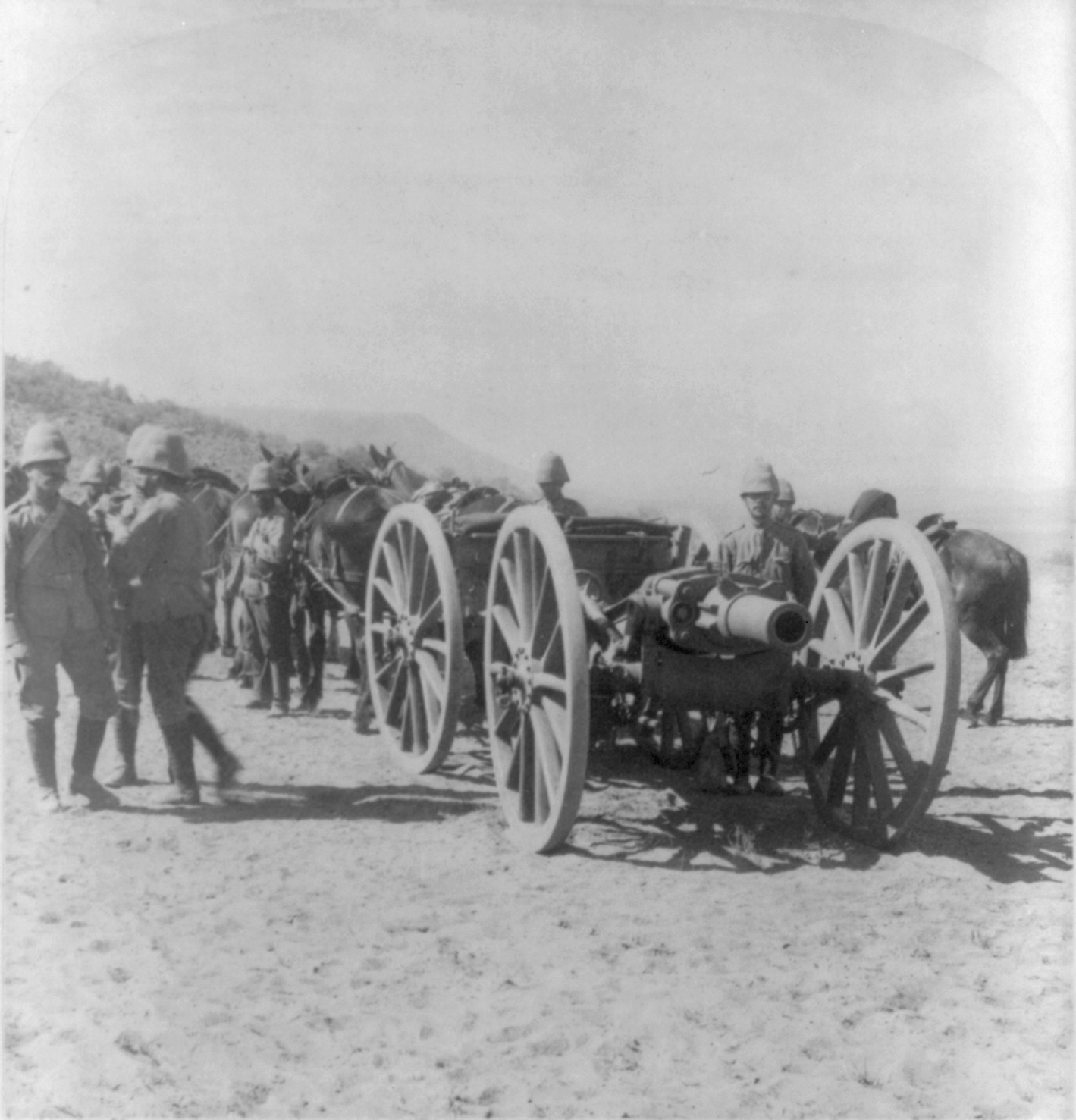
5-inch howitzer used by the Royal Artillery around 1900.

Traditionally, the basic unit of the Royal Artillery (RA) has always been the battery. Although batteries were organised into 'battalions', these were purely administrative groupings. Between 1859 and 1900, independent batteries were brigaded together into geographic groups termed at different times 'brigades', 'divisions' or 'brigade divisions' (though the titles had no connection with the field formations of the same names). The Second Boer War saw brigade divisions of three batteries established as a permanent unit type of the Royal Field Artillery, under the command of a lieutenant-colonel and comparable with an infantry battalion or cavalry regiment; they were redesignated simply brigades in 1903. One such new unit was XLIII Brigade Division, (Note: Regular RFA Brigades were designated by Roman numerals until 1938 when they were designated as regiments.) formed in March 1900 in India with the following organisation:

- XLIII Brigade Division Headquarters at Lucknow
- 1st Battery at Kirkee (Note: Originally formed in 1779, this battery had been N Bty in 1st Bde in 1877, and was numbered in 1889)
- 16th Battery at Kirkee (Note: Originally formed in 1771, this battery had been I Bty in 1st Bde in 1877, and was numbered in 1889)
- 41st Battery at Lucknow (Note: Originally formed in 1806, this battery had been O Bty in 1st Bde in 1877, and was numbered in 1889.)

By the end of 1901 the batteries had moved to Ahmedabad (1st), Neemuch (16th) and Nusseerabad (41st), and at the end of 1903 they had all moved to Trimulgherry, with Brigade HQ at Campbellpore under Brevet Colonel John Keir. In 1905 the whole brigade was stationed at Secunderabad under the command of Lt-Col C.M.T. Western, returning to Trimulgherry under Lt-Col I.A. Stokes during the year, where it remained until 1908. It then moved back to Secunderabad, now under Lt-Col J.F. Cadell. During 1909 the brigade returned to the UK under Lt-Col R.F. Fox, being stationed at Newport Monmouthshire, before moving to Royal Artillery Barracks, Woolwich under Lt-Col A.S. Tyndale-Biscoe. Lieutenant-Col A.W. Gay took command during 1912. . In 1913 XLIII (Howitzer) Bde was disbanded and its batteries were distributed to other brigades. Simultaneously XLIX (49th) (Howitzer) Bde was renumbered XLIII (Howitzer) Brigade and took its place. XLIX (Howitzer) Brigade had been formed at Aldershot in 1901 under Lt-Col (later Bt-Col) E.A. Burrows with 146th, 147th and 148th (H) Btys, all newly formed. It later moved to Bulford Camp before returning to Aldershot. During 1907 it moved to Newbridge and came under Bt-Col C.G. Henshaw, then to Woolwich under Bt-Col H.A. Bethell during 1909. In 1911 it went to Clonmel first under Lt-Col E.P. Lambert, then Lt-Col G Humphreys.

When XLIX (H) Brigade was redesignated XLIII (H) Bde in 1913,148 (H) Bty was disbanded. (Note: XLIX (H) Brigade was recreated in 1914 as a New Army unit for 14th (Light) Division, and disbanded in 1916.) Early in 1914, XLIII (H) Bde was reorganised again: 146 and 147 (H) Btys went to form a new VI Reserve Brigade at Glasgow, and XLIII was joined by the following batteries from brigades that were being broken up:

- 30th Battery from XLIV Bde (Note: This battery was originally formed in the Bombay Artillery in 1796.)
- 40th Battery from XLII Bde (Note: This battery was originally formed in 1803.)
- 57th Battery from XLIV Bde (Note: This battery was originally formed as I Troop, Royal Horse Artillery, in 1805.)

These were field gun batteries that would have had to convert to howitzers. By the outbreak of World War I, the howitzer batteries were each equipped with six 4.5-inch howitzers. Ammunition columns were only formed when a brigade was mobilised for active service. As part of the Haldane reforms in 1908 the men of the former Artillery Militia units of the Royal Garrison Artillery (RGA) joined the part-time Special Reserve as the Royal Field Reserve Artillery. Their wartime role was to form brigade ammunition columns (BACs) for the RFA.

XLIII (H) Brigade was now serving in Aldershot Command, assigned to 1st Division, which would form part of the British Expeditionary Force (BEF) if mobilisation was ordered.

== World War I ==
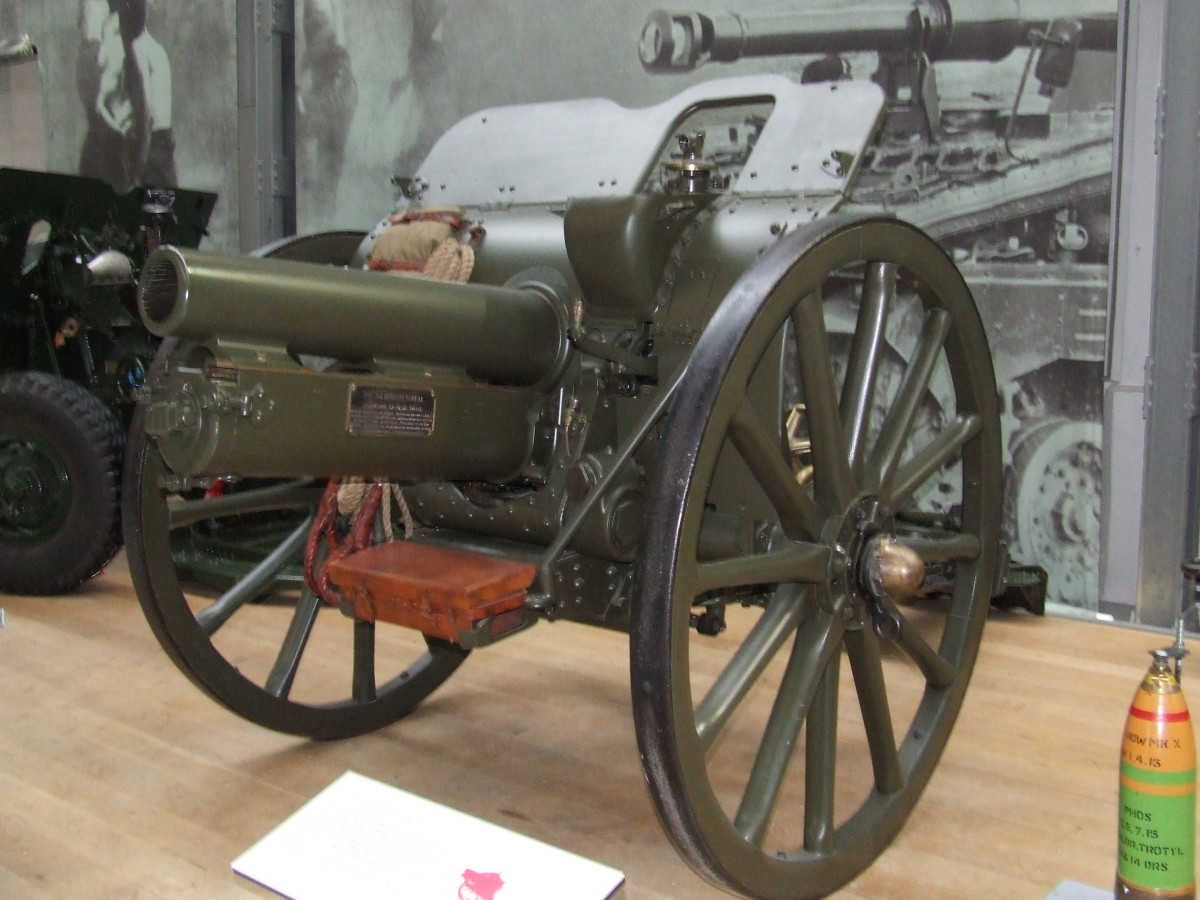
4.5-inch Howitzer in the collection of the Royal Artillery Museum.

=== Mobilisation ===
On the outbreak of war in Europe in August 1914, XLIII (H) Brigade was stationed at Deepcut Barracks, near Farnborough, Hampshire, under the command of Lt-Col Frederick Sharp. It received the order to mobilise at 18.00 on 5 August, (Note: According to the War Diary; the batteries recorded receiving the order on 4 August, which is the generally accepted date on which Britain ordered mobilisation.) reservists were absorbed and equipped, and the ammunition column was formed over the following days. The brigade completed its mobilisation on 14 August and two days later it entrained at Farnborough for Southampton, where it embarked (Brigade HQ and 57th (H) Bty aboard the SS Turcoman, 40th (H) Bty aboard the SS City of Chester) and sailed for France.

=== Western Front ===
XLIII (H) Brigade landed at Boulogne with 1st Division on 18 August. Once the division had concentrated around Le Nouvion it began to move forward on 21 August.

==== Mons ====
The BEF contacted the advancing Germans on 22 August and took up positions around Mons. The ground was generally flat and studded with mining villages, and was consequently poor for artillery observation. 1st Division's guns were deployed in the open, relatively close behind the infantry. On Sunday 23 August 40th (H) Bty was at Croix-lez-Rouveroy when the Battle of Mons opened. It remained observing, then at 17.00 'moved forward at speed to extricate 70th Battery' (of 2nd Division), 'which was being shelled by German howitzers'. The battery could not locate the enemy guns to return fire, and was back at its bivouacs at nightfall. Next day 40th (H) Bty sent forward a section to support the infantry while the remainder stayed in observation until a general withdrawal of the BEF was ordered at 11.00. It joined the whole of 1st Divisional Artillery (1st DA) in positions at Villers-Sire-Nicole where it fired at enemy cavalry squadrons when they came into range. It reached Feignies that night. The BEF's Retreat from Mons now began, the batteries mixed up with transport waggons on the congested roads.

On 27 August 30th (H) Bty was in action near Bernot with hostile guns, and that evening 40th (H) Bty was ordered back to support a 'hot rearguard action' north of Guise (1st (Guards) Brigade's Rearguard Affair of Étreux). Next day the battery reached Saint-Gobain, and though it deployed 'into action' it did not fire. 29 August was a rest day for the brigade. The retreat resumed next morning and continued for several days, the artillery horses becoming tired and the gunners very sleepy. By 4 September 57th (H) Bty was deployed with the rearguard overlooking the bridge over the River Marne at La Ferte. On 5 September 1 Division reached Coulommiers, out of contact with the enemy, and the brigade went into billets at Rozay. This ended the retreat, and on 6 September the BEF began to move forward again, 40th (H) Bty battery under the command of XXVI Bde supporting British cavalry probing ahead, while 57th (H) Bty traded fire with a concealed German battery. Later that day 1st Division advanced to the line Le Plessis–Andnoy. 40th (H) Battery rejoined XLIII (H) Bde at dusk and next day the battery accompanied the BEF's advanced guard as the Germans began to fall back as a result of the Battle of the Marne. Small cavalry engagements were continuing in front as the battery moved forward. On 8 September the column came under German shellfire and 40th (H) Bty was ordered into action to reply, but no observation post (OP) could be found and the German battery retired before 40th (H) Bty opened fire. Later it shelled the road near Boussières to hurry the German retirement. On 9 September 57th (H) Bty accompanied 2nd Infantry Brigade while the rest of XLIII (H) Bde advanced with 3rd Infantry Brigade to force a crossing of the River Marne at Nogent, finding that the cavalry had already crossed without opposition. The batteries spent the night at Beaurepaire Farm, north of Charly-sur-Marne.

==== Aisne ====
Next morning (10 September) the brigade engaged the flank guards of a German column marching eastwards. 40th (H) Bty marched at the head of a column sent against a reported German entrenched position 4 miles (6.4 km) ahead. The battery found itself 'thrust into a bad position into action against a retreating column'. The German guns returned fire, driving the 1st Battalion, Northamptonshire Regiment, off a ridge they had occupied; 40th (H) Bty was then ordered to 'search' the area behind the ridge, lobbing over its howitzer shells. Meanwhile the infantry were running back through the OP and the battery position, drawing hostile howitzer fire. Although this did little damage, several men were wounded at the battery's OP, and the divisional Commander, Royal Artillery, (CRA), Brigadier-General Neil Findlay, was killed while directing his guns. There were now no British infantry between the guns and the Germans, but 2nd Battalion King's Royal Rifle Corps came forward to fill the gap. 40th (H) Battery continued 'searching' for the enemy guns until it was ordered to shell the village of Priez, which was reported to be full of German infantry. The battery questioned the orders, which were repeated twice more before it fired a few shells: it was later found that the only troops in the village were British stragglers and wounded. The artillery continued to cover the advance until nightfall, the British batteries catching the Germans as they filed out of Chouy after retiring across the River Ourcq.

The batteries advanced with the infantry on 11 and 12 September. 57th (H) battery crossed the River Aisne on 12 September after the infantry fought their way over in the First Battle of the Aisne. It was followed by the rest of the brigade next day, when 1st DA was pushed onto the next spur beyond as the infantry captured the Chemin des Dames ridge. 30th (H) Battery went into action that evening. On 14 September the batteries marched at dawn to Tour de Paissy, establishing OPs and coming into action. 40th (H) Battery's OP could see 'several splendid targets', but before it could open fire the battery was ordered to Chivy to meet a German counter-attack at Montfaucon. By the time the battery arrived this attack had already been broken up by British guns, but 57th (H) Bty brought effective fire on the retiring enemy. The batteries spent the next two days shelling small parties of Germans and searching for their guns. On 15 September a section was ordered up to a hilltop alongside a section of 115th Bty, RFA, but the position was untenable because of heavy enemy shellfire and the section withdrew, losing some horses and having to abandon a gun until it could be recovered after nightfall. Similarly, 57th (H) Bty's OP had to be abandoned because of enfilade fire, and its commander was wounded. 40th (H) Battery was moved to the top of Mont Courtonne on 17 September, but complained that it gained nothing in view (the Germans were hidden behind the Chemin des Dames ridge), and lost 2,000 yards (1,800 m) in range. The Battle of the Aisne was now over, and the fighting became an artillery battle. The batteries remained at Paissy for the rest of the month, finding better positions and OPs, digging themselves in, and camouflaging the gun pits from air observation. The batteries fired about 250 rounds a day against small German attacks until ordered on 29 September to conserve ammunition, when expenditure went down to about 100 per day. The Germans launched a counter-attack on 30 September, the howitzers engaging the advancing lines of German infantry; 40th (H) Bty fired 667 shells, and had a number of casualties from shellfire at the OP and waggon lines. While 40th (H) Bty chiefly fired at German infantry digging trenches, 30th (H) Bty on 1 October for the first time worked with a wireless-equipped observation aircraft to fire at enemy gun batteries. Over the following days the brigade exchanged desultory fire with enemy batteries, suffering a steady trickle of casualties. On 10 October the enemy attacked 10th Infantry Bde, whereupon 30th and 40th (H) Btys fired on the approaches to the German trenches. The batteries also replied to German batteries bombarding 1st Division and nearby French troops during the continuing fighting on the Chemin des Dames 11–14 October.

==== Ypres ====
The BEF was then shifted northwards to head off the flanking Germans in the 'Race to the Sea'. XLIII (H) Brigade concentrated under cover of the Couronne Ridge on the evening of 15 October and the following evening entrained at Neuilly-Saint-Front. After detraining at Saint-Omer on 18 October it marched towards to Ypres, arriving at Pilckem in front of the city on 21 October as 1st Division entered the First Battle of Ypres. The advanced guard, accompanied by 40th (H) Bty, drove back enemy troops encountered near Langemarck. The brigade deployed next day, 30th (H) Bty moving by sections to Langemarck, 57th (H) Bty north-west of Pilckem to obtain a field of fire over the ground towards Houthulst Forest, and 40th (H) Bty registered two bridges at ranges from 3,100 yards (2,800 m) to 4,500 yards (4,100 m) from its OP in Bixschoote Church. During the subsequent Battle of Langemarck 40th (H) Bty's forward section suffered a few casualties from rifle fire, so the battery retired about 200 yards (180 m) and resumed firing in support of the British defenders. 57th (H) Battery was under XXVI Bde to support 1st (Guards) Infantry Bde, and was itself under rifle fire until Lt-Col Sharp moved it about 440 yards (400 m) further south. 1st Division counter-attacked on 23 October, supported by the whole of 1st DA, and the batteries spent almost all day shelling German trenches from positions that were themselves under rifle and shell fire. Fighting continued next day, with 40th (H) Bty's OP established in the infantry's fire trench. Lieutenant-Col Sharp commanded a group with 30th (H) and 117th Btys until 1st DA was relieved by the French and withdrew into Ypres that evening.

On 26 October the brigade returned to the front near Gheluvelt, when 1st Division relieved the hard-pressed 2nd Division. 57th (H) Battery moved up with 1st (Gds) Bde while the remainder of XLIII (H) Bde rendezvoused at Zillebeke in corps reserve before marching to Hooge with 3rd Infantry Bde. 57th (H) Battery found itself under shellfire throughout 27–28 October and was forced to retire on 29 October as the Battle of Gheluvelt began. There were only about nine rounds per gun available anyway, but later in the day 1st DA concentrated its fire on the German guns around Gheluvelt and got the better of them. The Germans failed to break through over the following days as the fighting line was reinforced with whatever was available: on 30 October 57th (H) Bty sent up one gun from Westhoek to assist the infantry defending a barricade in front; next day it sent up two. When the Germans captured Gheluvelt on 31 October, the brigade was withdrawn south west of Westhoek. Throughout the battle the main battery positions and waggon lines were under shellfire, casualties in men and horses mounted, and the batteries changed position several times. A false report of a German breakthrough during the night of 3/4 November led 57th (H) Bty to withdraw its guns out of German range and conceal them in undergrowth about 400 yards (370 m) back. By now the ammunition shortage was so bad that I Corps withdrew one third of its field artillery so that they would not be exposed to fire to which they could not reply. With two of its batteries detached (40th (H) Bty was in corps reserve), XLIII (H) Bde HQ was withdrawn to Vlamertinge on 5 November and 57th (H) Bty moved out later, leaving its detached gun with 2nd Infantry Bde. The battery went into billets near Dickebusch before moving to rest at Hazebrouck from 6 to 11 November.

40th (H) Battery returned from corps reserve on 10 November and was positioned west of Hooge. Next day the Germans renewed their attack up the Menin Road (the Battle of Nonne Boschen), which was eventually broken up by British rifle and shell fire. However, the Prussian Guard broke into 1st Infantry Bde's line, and 57th (H) Bty's detached section on the Menin Road suffered a number of casualties, including the detachment commander (a Special Reserve officer who had only joined the battery the previous day), who was captured. 57th (H) Battery was brought up to Vlamertinge with XXVI Bde next day, coming into action at Bellewaarde Farm on 13 November, the guns and waggons struggling through the muddy tracks. From 14 to 21 November XLIII (H) Bde was in action at Hooge. 57th (H) Battery (less its detachment in the trenches) marched back through Vlamertinge on 17 November to rest in bivouacs at Merris. Although I Corps and 1st Division had been relieved on 15 November, XLIII (H) Bde remained in action a little longer, 30th (H) Bty suffering serious casualties to its officers and NCOs under heavy shelling on 19 November. Over the next two days the brigade was withdrawn by sections as it was progressively relieved by French artillery. It marched to Bailleul where it rested.

==== Winter 1914–15 ====
On 26 November 57th (H) Bty moved to Estaires, where it was attached to the newly-arrived 8th Division, which had no howitzers of its own. The battery established a position for four guns, the remaining two being kept ready to reinforce 8th DA's XXXIII Bde. It was present during the division's attack on the Moated Grange at Neuve-Chapelle on 18 December. The rest of the brigade refitted at Merris until 22 December, thereby missing 1st Division's defence of Givenchy, when it went into the line to support the Indian Corps on 20–21 December.

On the night of 23/24 December the brigade relieved the artillery of the 3rd (Lahore) Division, getting 40th (H) Bty and a section of 30th (H) Bty into action before daybreak. Trench warfare had now set in along the Western Front, and the divisions' dispositions became fixed. 1st Division divided its sector into a northern and a southern section, supported by 30th (H) and 40th (H) Btys respectively, with Brigade HQ at Beuvry. The artillery were ordered to send all horses not actually required at the guns back to the waggon lines, but 30th (H) Bty obtained a postponement of this order because its horses were under shelter from the winter weather. Firing took place every day, though the ammunition allowance was very small. On 24 January 1915 the brigade noted increased enemy shelling, and 30th (H) Bty replied on the German trenches. Next day the Germans attacked Givenchy and Cuinchy, north and south of the La Bassée Canal, and held by 3rd and 1st Bdes respectively. The defenders were warned by a German deserter, and 40th (H) Bty had opened fire at 07.15 on Railway Triangle. The attack at 07.30 captured the British front trenches and reached as far as the hollow by the railway embankment, where they were halted by the fire of 40th (H) and other batteries. By 11.00 British infantry had reoccupied the hollow and at 12.00 a line was established 400 yards (370 m) in front of Cuinchy. The attack north of the canal was made at 07.50 and communications to 30th (H) Bty's OP were cut by shellfire. Major E.B. MacNaughton went into Givenchy, where he found that the Germans had reached the church. The battery's fire prevented the German supports from coming up, and local counter-attacks restored the situation by 13.00. A new attack at Cuinchy on 29 January was repulsed with heavy loss to the Germans. On 1 February 2 Division relieved 1st Division, but 1st DA remained in position. 40th (H) Battery fired at the trenches in front of Railway Triangle to support local attacks by 4th (Guards) Bde on the Brickstacks on 1 and 6 February. XLIII (H) Brigade Ammunition Column was relieved on 3 February, and the batteries were relieved by sections over the nights of 5–7 February. The brigade went into rest billets at Ferfay.

==== Neuve Chapelle ====
On 18 February XLIII (H) Bde was ordered to join Indian Corps, when it would be rejoined by 57th (H) Bty. Next day the brigade moved to Pacaut, under 3rd (Lahore) Division, with 30th (H) Bty under 7th (Meerut) Division. On 3 and 4 March 40th (H) and 57th (H) Btys also came into action, and all three began registering targets for the forthcoming Battle of Neuve Chapelle. The German defences formed a salient, giving the British artillery the advantage of converging fire. The howitzers concentrated on redoubts and trenches (actually sandbag breastworks, because the ground was too wet for deep trenches). The full bombardment opened suddenly at 07.30 on 10 March, an hour after sunrise, when it was hoped that light would be sufficient for accurate observation. The second phase began at 08.05 when the guns lifted from the front and support trenches to the strongpoints behind, while the infantry crossed No man's land to carry out the assault. The Indian Corps' attack was made by the Garhwal Bde, and apart from one battalion advancing from 'Port Arthur' that missed its direction and attacked an intact trench, the leading companies were on their objective ('Smith-Dorrien Trench') beyond Neuve Chapelle village by 09.00. The Dehra Dun Bde came up in support and organised an attack to take the trench missed by the wayward battalion; the divisional commander ordered XLIII (H) Bde to carry out a further bombardment of this trench opposite Port Arthur, and 57th (H) Bty complied. That afternoon the trench was cleared, and by nightfall the Meerut Division was consolidating the captured ground. XLIII (H) Brigade kept up a slow rate of fire during the night.

The attack was renewed at 07.00 on 11 March, with Indian Corps advancing though the Bois de Biez, which XLIII (H) Bde supported with shellfire on the houses along the roads leading to the wood. The batteries then responded to reports of enemy activity along the La Bassée road on the right flank, and of machine guns in the NW corner of the wood. In the afternoon 40th (H) Bty's OP reported a trench that was not shown on the map and was likely to hold up the advance: this was also shelled. However, little was achieved during the day, and after dark the leading battalions of the Dehra Dun and Garhwal brigades withdrew to the morning's start line. Next day the Germans launched a counter-attack: although their artillery was badly directed, their attack was shielded by morning mist. However, the Meerut Division, manning the original German line in front of Port Arthur, had listening posts out and opened a devastating fire on the attackers on their front, while XLIII (H) Bde shelled the wood and crossroads in support. The counter-attack was completely broken up. The Indian Corps made a few gains later that day, but the offensive was closed down that night, when it was found that artillery ammunition was running short.

After Neuve Chapelle, XLIII (H) Bde (less 30th (H) Bty) was moved on 17 March to support 7th Division. Lieutenant-Col Sharp was given command of '3rd Group' of artillery including his own and XXXVII (H) Bde (less one battery) for an intended renewal of the offensive. On 28 March CXVIII Bde from the Canadian Division was added to 3rd Group, but the group did no more than occasional registration shoots. 3rd Group was broken up at the beginning of April and on 4 April XLIII Bde marched back to rejoin Indian Corps, with 30th and 40th (H) Btys attached to the Meerut and Lahore Divisions respectively, and 57th (H) Bty in billets. From 15 April the three batteries were grouped with the infantry brigades of the Meerut Division they were to support:

- Northern Group: 57th (H) Bty with Bareilley Bde
- Centre Group: 40th (H) Bty with Dehra Dun Bde
- Southern Group: 30th (H) Bty with Garhwal Bde

==== St Julien ====
After dark on 24 April 40th and 57th (H) Btys were withdrawn to the waggon lines and marched north with Bde HQ to the Ypres Salient, where the Lahore Division had been sent to reinforce Second Army. The northern flank of the salient had been virtually overrun in the opening phase of the Second Battle of Ypres on 22 April. The Lahore Division was launched into a counter-attack (the Battle of St Julien) on the afternoon of 26 April, preceded by an artillery bombardment from 13.20 to 14.00. There had not been time to find positions for all of the division's artillery, and most of the batteries were on the west bank of the Ypres–Ijzer Canal; however, 40th (H) Bty was positioned at St Jean on the east side, immediately behind the division. Once the attack was launched at 14.00, the field guns began 5 minutes rapid fire on the enemy line, then lifted ahead, while the howitzers fired at strongpoints behind the line. The infantry (Jullundur and Ferozepore Bdes) carried small yellow flags to indicate their progress to the gunners, but they were badly mauled by enemy artillery as soon as they crossed Hill Top Ridge, and the flags did not reach the enemy line: XLIII (H) Bde was soon ordered to bring its fire back onto the enemy trenches. The Lahore Division was ordered to renew the attack next day (27 April) using the fresh Sirhind Bde alongside the battered Ferozepore Bde. The preparatory bombardment began at 12.30 and lifted onto the German second line and roads at 13.15 when the infantry were to attack (the Sirhind Bde did not wait, but to get the benefit of the bombardment moved out as soon as it began). However, the attack was held up son after the infantry crossed Hill Top Ridge. The attackers were still 300 yards (270 m) short of the German positions, so a fresh artillery preparation began at 17.30 and an attack was launched an hour later, but the neighbouring French troops were driven back by gas, and the attacks failed. Although 57th (H) Bty fired in support of a French attack on 28 April, the Allies were in fact pulling back to a more defensible line in front of Ypres, and 40th (H) Bty was withdrawn from St Jean.

==== Aubers Ridge ====
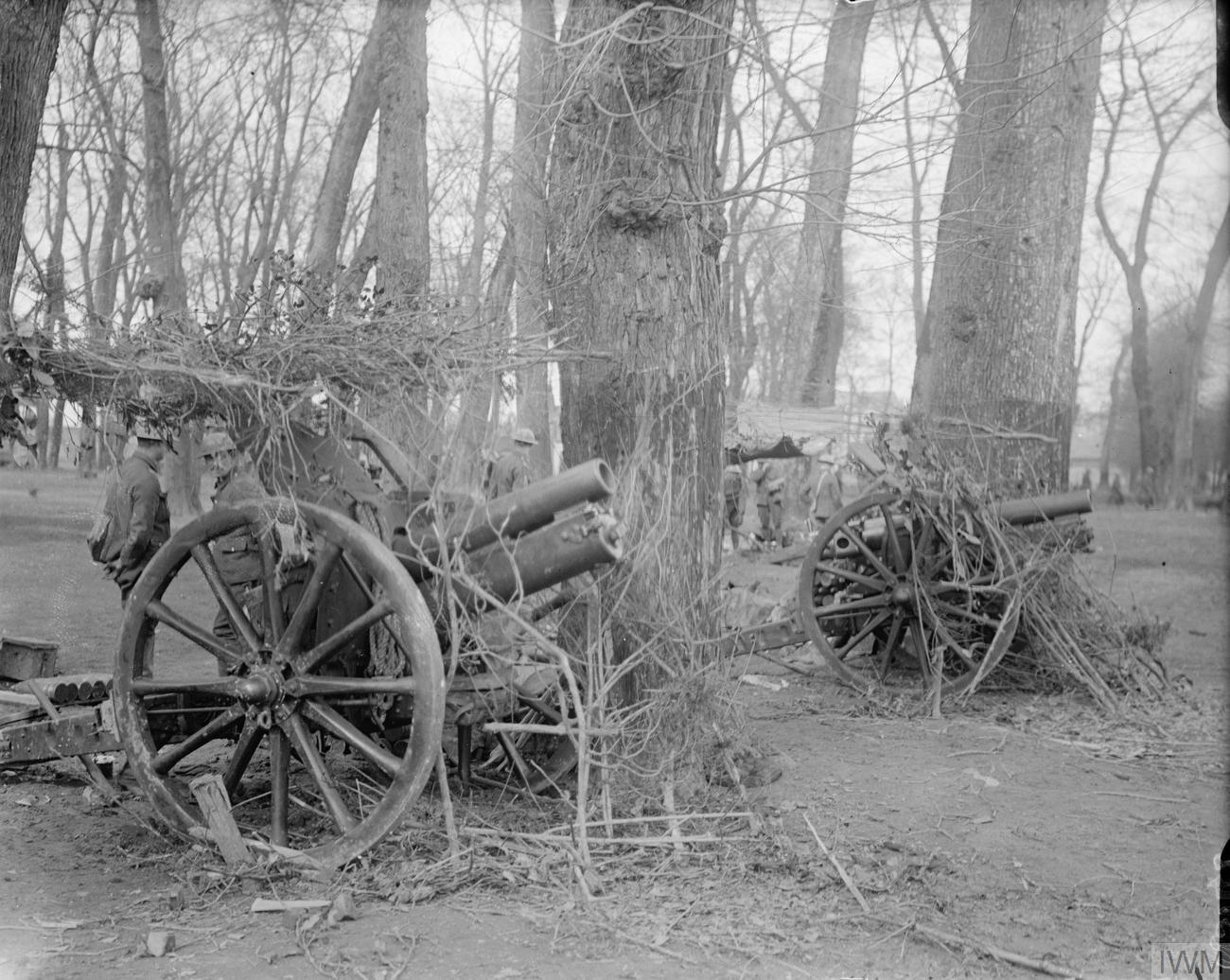
Camouflaged 4.5-inch howitzers deployed on the Western Front.

For a few days the batteries continued counter-battery (CB) fire and night firing on Pilckem to harass the enemy, but on 3 May the brigade marched out with Lahore Division which was returning to its previous sector with First Army to take part in the Battle of Aubers Ridge. Indian Corps' artillery plan assigned the whole of XLIII Bde's 4.5-inch and two RGA batteries of 6-inch howitzers to the task of demolishing the German parapet to a width of 800 yards (730 m) so that the Meerut Division could assault it from Port Arthur. From 6 to 8 May the brigade registered its guns, then the attack went in on 9 May, the bombardment beginning at 05.00. At first only the wire-cutting 18-pounder field guns fired, with XLIII (H) Bde observing, then the brigade's own batteries opened at 05.10. The bombardment was to last for 40 minutes, of which the last 10 minutes was to be at 'intense' rate, with the 18-pdrs adding their fire to the howitzers against the parapets. At 05.40 the British guns lifted about 600 yards (550 m) behind the German front positions and the infantry attacked. By 06.00 it was clear that the attack was held up along the whole front: very few gaps had been made in the Germans' 6 feet (1.8 m) parapet, and the covering artillery fire had lifted too quickly. The Meerut Division's infantry were shot down in rows by machine gun fire, and although XLIII (H) Bde turned its howitzers back onto the parapet at 06.10 it was difficult to locate the machine gun loopholes and a second assault also failed. At 09.00 the brigade received orders for a reorganised 40-minute bombardment at 12.00, twice delayed and finally fired at 15.20; the renewed attack at 16.00 also failed. A planned attack by fresh troops at dusk was called off. By the end of the day the brigade's 18 howitzers had fired 1975 Lyddite high explosive and 261 Shrapnel shells. First Army was now so short of ammunition that the offensive had to be suspended.

==== Festubert ====
XLIII (H) Brigade now came directly under Meerut Division, with 30th (H) Bty in 'Southern Group' and the others in 'Northern Group'. On 12 May the batteries began a steady bombardment of the enemy's trenches for the renewal of the offensive on 15 May (the Battle of Festubert), though accurate shooting was hindered by poor visibility, and it was reported that many of the newly-arrived 4.5-inch shells were 'blinds' (failed to explode). The howitzers kept up fire at night to prevent the Germans from repairing the damage. At 23.30 on the night of 15/16 May the Garhwal Bde launched an attack intended to be a surprise, but the men had been spotted forming up and laying bridges over the dykes, and the Germans illuminated the attackers with flares and searchlights. By 12.45 it was known that the attack had failed in the face of small arms and shellfire. It was renewed at 03.45 and again failed. By morning the batteries had to prepare defensive barrages to deal with Germans seen massing for counter-attacks; later that day and the following days they were switched to helping the neighbouring British formations that had seen some success and continued their attacks. However, 4.5-inch ammunition was very short, and the batteries could only fire at slow rate or in short bursts. The Sirhind Bde of Lahore Division made another failed attempt on 22 May, after which the fighting petered out.

==== Givenchy ====
First Army reorganised its front at the end of May and on 4 June XLIII (H) Bde came under IV Corps. The batteries moved a short distance to the Givenchy sector, first under 7th Division, but then on 6 June became part of 'Canadian Howitzer Group' under Canadian Division. The guns registered on the new targets in their front, but a proposed operation was postponed and they fell silent for a few days. The attack on 15 June (the Second Action of Givenchy) was preceded by 48 hours' slow bombardment to destroy trenches and wire, but the operation was limited by the shortage of artillery ammunition and only on the afternoon of 14 June did 30th and 57th (H) Btys began firing on German communication trenches. The brigade was then told that it would not be needed until 12.00 on 15 June, when it fired 25 rounds per gun over trenchs; between 16.00 and 17.00 a further 10 RPG of shrapnel was fired over communication trenches. The brigade then reverted to firing on the front trenches before 7th and 51st (Highland) Divisions launched their assault at 18.00 and 1st Canadian Battalion (West Ontario Regiment) moved out to form a defensive flank. XLIII (H) Brigade fired a series of barrages on the German rear trenches to shield the attackers. However, the Germans protected by dugouts and strongpoints drove the attackers back from the frontline trenches they had entered, and by dawn all survivors were back in their own lines. A new attack was arranged for 05.30 on 16 June after a 2-hour bombardment (all that the ammunition supply would allow). Once again XLIII (H) Bde bombarded the German communication trenches, but at 04.00 the attack was postponed and the batteries were ordered to cease fire to conserve ammunition – XLIII (H) BAC reported that it had no shrapnel shells left. Morning mist made artillery observation difficult, and it was not until 16.05 that the bombardment recommenced. The attack went in at 16.45, and although a few units of 7th and 51st (H) Divisions gained a foothold in the German front line before being driven out, 3rd Canadian Battalion (Toronto Regiment) was unable to advance because of heavy fire along its whole front. Further attacks were repeatedly postponed and finally called off on 19 June.

57th (H) Battery (with a section of the BAC) was permanently transferred to 8th Division on 23 June 1915, leaving XLIII (H) Bde with just two batteries, which was now the standard establishment for the BEF's howitzer brigades. The Canadian Division moved away on 24 June and XLIII (H) Bde went to rest billets at Ferfay. At the end of the month 40th (H) Bty went to Vermelles where it rejoined 1st DA for the first time since February. It spent the following weeks in 1st Division's Sector Y, exchanging retaliatory fire with Germans in Auchy-les-Mines and Hulluch, north of Loos-en-Gohelle. 30th (H) Battery moved up and began preparing positions on 13 July to support 1st Division's Sector Z. From 20 July a section of each battery was relieved by a section from LXXIII (H) Bde, a New Army ('Kitchener's Army') unit just arrived in France with 15th (Scottish) Division. The newcomers were introduced to trench warfare until 5 August. The front remained quiet, with just a few shells fired each day.

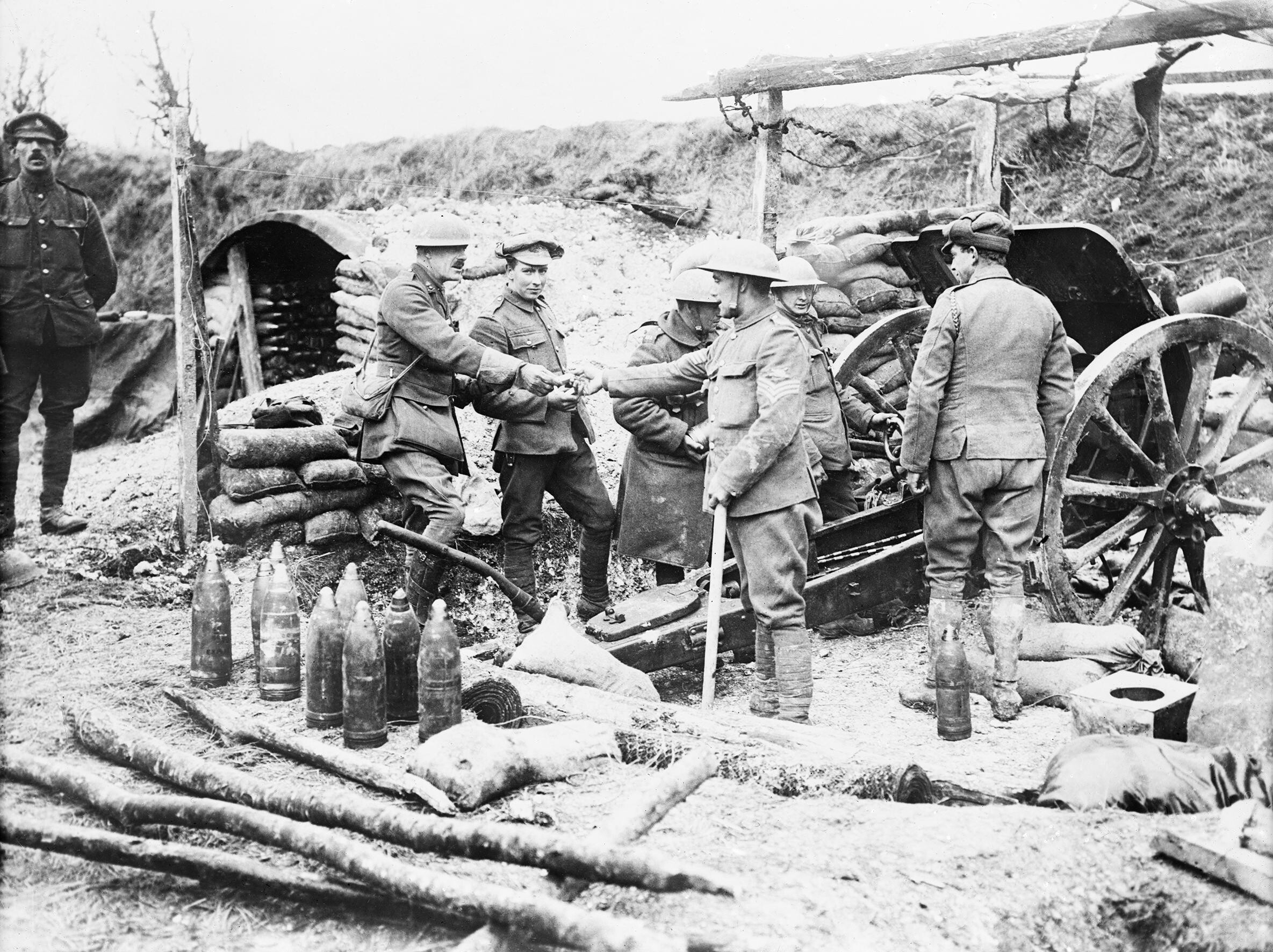
An emplaced 4.5-inch howitzer on the Western Front.

==== Loos ====
However, the Loos sector had been chosen for the BEF's autumn offensive. Among the preparations, XLIII (H) Bde was redeployed at the end of August, with 30th (H) Bty coming under 15th (S) DA at Verques, and 40th (H) Bty positioned to cover from the Béthune–Lens road to the mine spoilheap known as the 'Double Crassier'. On 2 September Brigade HQ at Les Brébis took control of a howitzer sub-group comprising its own 40th (H) Bty (6 x 4.5-inch), 21st London (H) Bty (4 x 5-inch) from 47th (1/2nd London) Division, and the newly-arrived 24th Siege Battery, RGA (4 x 6-inch). The howitzer sub-group in turn came under the 'MacNaghten Group' of 47th (1/2nd L) DA. The batteries prepared their new gun positions and established communications to their OPs. From 4 September the batteries began registering their new targets, but otherwise remained silent. Orders for the new offensive (the Battle of Loos) arrived on 12 September, proposing a 4-day preliminary bombardment. The batteries and BACs established ammunition dumps at the gun positions and the advanced waggon lines to cover daily expenditure, so that they would only need to re-supply under cover of darkness. C (H) Bty of CIX (H) Bde (4 x 4.5-inch) arrived from 24th Division on attachment to the sub-group, but caused problems because it did not bring its own ammunition column. The bombardment began on 21 September, the howitzer sub-group firing at various trenches, houses and redoubts (including one on the Double Crassier), though 40th (H) Bty reported 25 per cent of its shells failing to explode due to faulty fuzes, while the shooting of 21st London (H) Bty was described as 'erratic'. At 05.50 on 25 September the British released gas clouds towards the German trenches and the bombardment was renewed, with the howitzer sub-group concentrating on the enemy second line and communication trenches, while 40th (H) Bty laid down a barrage. IV Corps' infantry assault went in at 06.30: 15th (S) Division swept into Loos behind the gas and 47th (1/2nd L) Division successfully formed a defensive right flank, supported by the MacNaghten Group. However, on the left the gas had blown back onto 1st Division, and in the confusion a gap opened up between that formation and 15th (S). Some of the Scottish units had gone as far ahead as Hill 70, but with an open flank they were pushed off it. When 1st Division was able to advance, batteries of 1st DA followed behind, and by 15.30 30th (H) Bty had pushed forward north of Bois Carré: the close support fire enabled the division to take the Lone Tree feature before nightfall. XLIII (H) Brigade HQ had taken over command of the MacNaghten Group at 15.00, adding XXV Bde (3 batteries of 18-pdrs), 16th London Bty and a section of 15th London Bty (15-pdrs) to the howitzer sub-group.

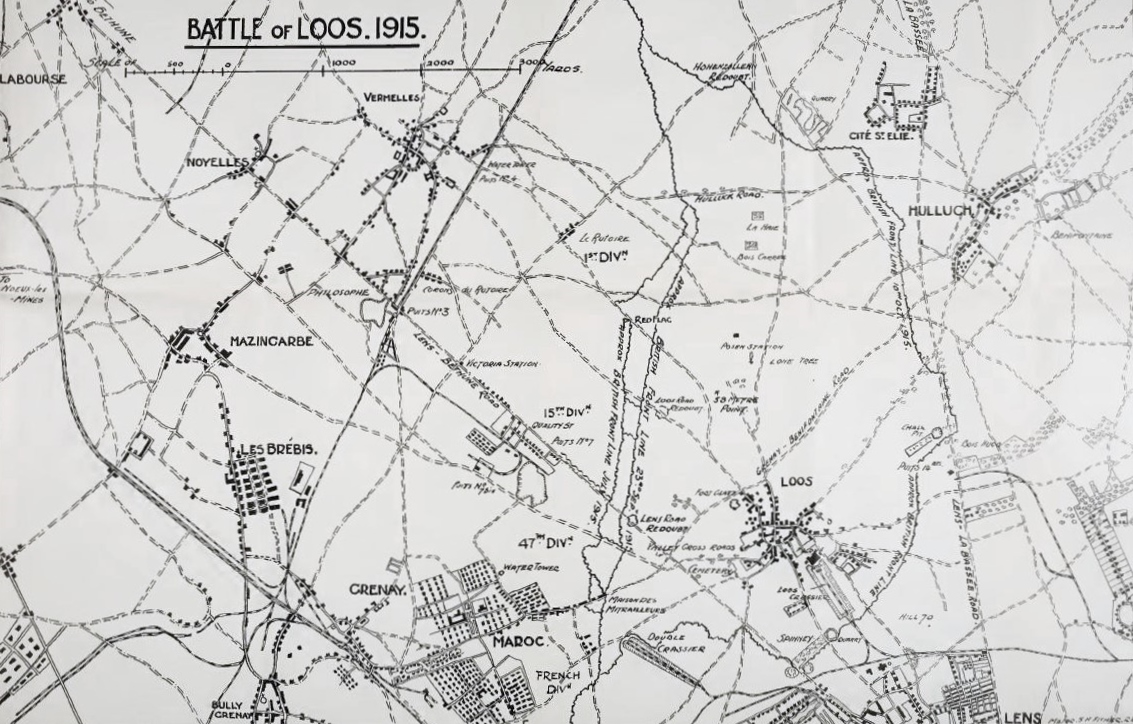
The Battle of Loos.

Next day, the group was ordered to support a renewed attack by 15th (S) Division on Hill 70, the 15- and 18-pdrs putting down a barrage ahead of the infantry, 40th (H) Bty observing the Double Crassier, and 24th Siege Bty endeavouring to knock out a troublesome machine gun post. 22nd London (H) Bty (5-inch) was added to the group, and together with the batteries of XXV Bde was turned onto various targets reported by the advancing infantry, such as machine gun positions. In the afternoon 15th London Bty pushed four guns forward to North Maroc and brought them into action against the redoubt on Hill 70, but 22nd London (H) Bty had to cease fire having run out of T Tubes to fire the guns. 15th (S) Division's attack failed, and by the end of the day 30th (H) Bty, close to the fighting, had suffered one officer killed and 12 other ranks wounded.

The artillery group under XLIII (H) Bde HQ continued firing on 27 September, mainly on copses and mine buildings, while the Guards Division was attacking Hill 70 from the north and 47th (1/2nd L) Division attempted to take the Chalk Pits. The fighting died down on 28 September, the guns establishing defensive barrage lines, and 40th (H) Bty taking the opportunity to move up to shorten the range. On 1 October French troops began to relieve 47th (1/2nd L) Division on the right flank, and XXV Bde vacated its positions. From 2 October the batteries under XLIII Bde HQ (now the 'Sharp Group' named after its commander) were 40th (H), 21st and 22nd London (H), and 23rd (old 6-inch 30 cwt howitzers) and 24th Siege. 24th Siege Bty then transferred to 15th (S) DA and 30th (H) Bty rejoined. Orders were issued on 3 October for a three-day bombardment preceding a new attack, but were then postponed, and the batteries merely maintained their defensive 'night lines'. The attack was then ordered for 13 October: while most of the weight was against the Hohenzollern Redoubt, 1st Division also attacked towards Hulluch. The batteries had prepared ammunition dumps for this operation and on 12 October concentrated their fire on the enemy wire. The bombardment began at 12.00 next day, and gas was released at 13.00, when the Sharp Group put down a heavy concentration of fire on the enemy front line. The infantry attacked at 14.00 under cover of smoke but the enemy wire was hardly damaged and the attack failed with heavy casualties. 1st Division's men were forced to shelter in long grass until they could withdraw after dark.

==== Winter 1915–16 ====
Active operations now ended for the winter. XLIII (H) Bde was relieved from 15 October and moved back to billets at Lapugnoy where it began a round of training and inspections (except 40th (H) Bty, which went back into the line with 47th (1/2nd L) DA). On 12 November 1st DA reformed 'Sharp Group', with 5th Siege Bty, RGA, in addition to 30th and 40th (H) Btys, and it went back into action registering various pit-heads, quarries and trenches, and exchanging retaliatory fire with enemy batteries. Ammunition supply had eased, but its quality was poor, with many 'blinds' and 'prematures'. The guns remained in action whichever division of IV Corps was holding the front. This continued into the early months of 1916. For some time 30th (H) Bty had a detached gun ('B gun') firing from the Chalk Pit south of Loos. In mid-January this gun was handed over to 15th (S) DA and another received in exchange; with two guns attached from 40th (H) Bty, 30th (H) Bty was divided into two 4-gun batteries at South Maroc to carry out CB tasks for 15th (S) DA, while the remainder of XLIII (H) Bde was withdrawn to rest at Lapugnoy. 30th (H) Battery rejoined the brigade in billets at the end of January. On 16 February 1st DA returned to the front, with 2nd Siege Bty, RGA, joining XLIII (H) Bde's group facing the Double Crassier. Regular targets included enemy held mine craters, OPs and Minenwerfer positions. 1st Divisional Artillery placed one 18-pdr and one howitzer from 40th (H) Bty (the 'Loos Twins') in the town of Loos to enfilade German trenches in 'The Triangle'. Routine exchanges of fire increased in the spring, as both sides carried out mining and raiding. On 29 April the Germans carried out a gas attack on 1st Division, and the gunners of 30th (H) Bty at Maroc had to put on their gas helmets.

=== Disbandment ===
In May 1916, the artillery of infantry divisions was reorganised; the pure howitzer brigades were disbanded, and their batteries attached individually to field brigades, in order to produce mixed brigades of three field batteries and one (4-gun) howitzer battery. XLIII (H) Brigade was broken up among the other RFA brigades of 1st DA on 22 May:

- 30th (H) Bty (less one section) to XXXIX Bde
- 40th (H) Bty (less one section) to XXVI Bde
- D (H) Bty (formed from one section from each of the other batteries) to XXV Bde
- XLIII (H) BAC absorbed into 1st Divisional Ammunition Column

Lieutenant-Col Sharp had already been posted away on 25 April to command XXXIX Bde (Note: He was killed at the Battle of the Somme on 13 August 1916 while in command of XXXIX Bde.) and the rest of Brigade HQ was disbanded on 26 May.

=== Home Defence ===
XLIII Brigade, RFA, was reformed in the UK on 26 November 1917 and assigned to 67th (2nd Home Counties) Division, a 2nd Line Territorial Force (TF) formation whose divisional artillery had been sent to the Mesopotamian Front. The new brigade had the following composition:

- 1212th (West Riding) Bty – formerly 10th Provisional Bty, transferred from 227th Mixed Brigade, a home defence formation attached to 67th (2nd HC) Division
- A Bty
- B Bty
- D (H) Bty

That winter 67th (2nd HC) Division was deployed in Eastern England, with the field artillery between Colchester and Ipswich. It maintained these stations for the rest of the war.

== Postwar ==
After the Armistice with Germany 67th (2nd HC) Division and its units were progressively demobilised, the artillery beginning disbandment in March 1919.

XLIII Brigade's number was not used again by the Regular Royal Artillery until 1947 when 5th Field Regiment was converted into 43rd Searchlight Regiment; it was disbanded in 1959.
