= Vailly =

Vailly may refer to the following places in France:

- Vailly, Aube, a commune in the Aube department
- Vailly, Haute-Savoie, a commune in the Haute-Savoie department
- Vailly-sur-Aisne, a commune in the Aisne department
- Vailly-sur-Sauldre, a commune in the Cher department in the Centre region of France.
