= Mark Mackenzie =

Scottish cricketer and British Army officer

Personal information
- Full name: Mark Kincaid Mackenzie
- Born: 22 August 1888; Edinburgh, Midlothian, Scotland
- Died: 25 September 1914 (aged 26); Soupir, Aisne, France
- Batting: Unknown
- Bowling: Left-arm fast-medium
- Relatives: Lord Mackenzie (father)

Domestic team information
- Years: Team
- 1910: Oxford University

Career statistics
Competition	First-class
Matches	3
Runs scored	65
Batting average	16.25
100s/50s	–/–
Top score	48*
Balls bowled	390
Wickets	6
Bowling average	30.83
5 wickets in innings	–
10 wickets in match	–
Best bowling	2/65
Catches/stumpings	3/–
- Source: Cricinfo, 17 January 2020

Mark Kincaid Mackenzie (22 August 1888 – 25 September 1914) was a Scottish first-class cricketer and British Army officer.

The son of Lord Mackenzie and Lady Mackenzie, he was born in Edinburgh in August 1888. He was educated at Winchester College, before going up to Magdalen College, Oxford. While studying at Oxford, Mackenzie played first-class cricket for Oxford University on three occasions in 1910, against Kent, Surrey and the Gentlemen of England. He scored 65 runs in his three matches, at an average of 16.25 and with a high score of 48 not out. With his left-arm fast-medium bowling, he took 6 wickets at a bowling average of 30.83 and best figures of 2 for 65. Alongside cricket, Mackenzie was a keen amateur golfer and was a member of the Honourable Company of Edinburgh Golfers.

While still studying at Oxford, Mackenzie was commissioned as a second lieutenant in the Auxiliary Forces in May 1908. After graduating from Oxford Mackenzie chose a career in the British Army. Having been attached to the East Lancashire Regiment as a member of the Auxiliary Forces, he was assigned to the King's Royal Rifle Corps in July 1911,. where he was attached to the 4th Battalion and served in British India. He was promoted to lieutenant in March 1914 and was on home leave when the First World War was declared in at the end of July 1914. He was seconded to the Rifle Brigade at the commencement of hostilities, where he was sent to France and took part in the Battle of the Aisne in September 1914. Involved in a dawn assault on German trenches near Soupir on 25 September, Mackenzie was wounded in the assault, but was seen to return to his feet to lead his platoon and was a short while later wounded for a second time, this time fatally. His body was recovered from the battlefield and buried at the Montcornet Cemetery.
