= Charles Kincaid Mackenzie =

Scottish law lord and cricketer

Charles Kincaid Mackenzie, Lord Mackenzie (1857–1938) was a Scottish lawyer who served as a Senator of the College of Justice. He was also a cricketer.

== Life ==
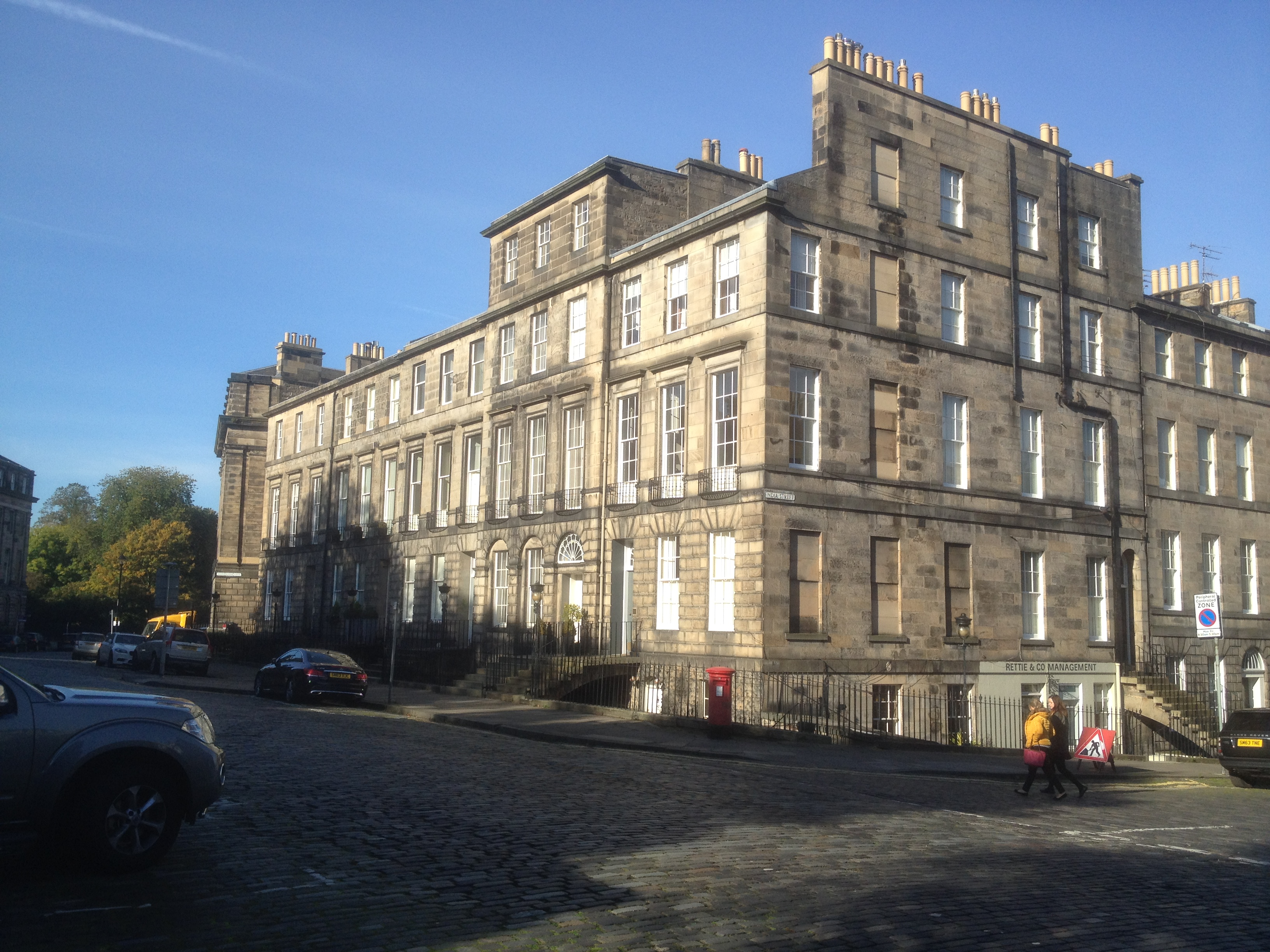
43 to 47 Heriot Row, Edinburgh

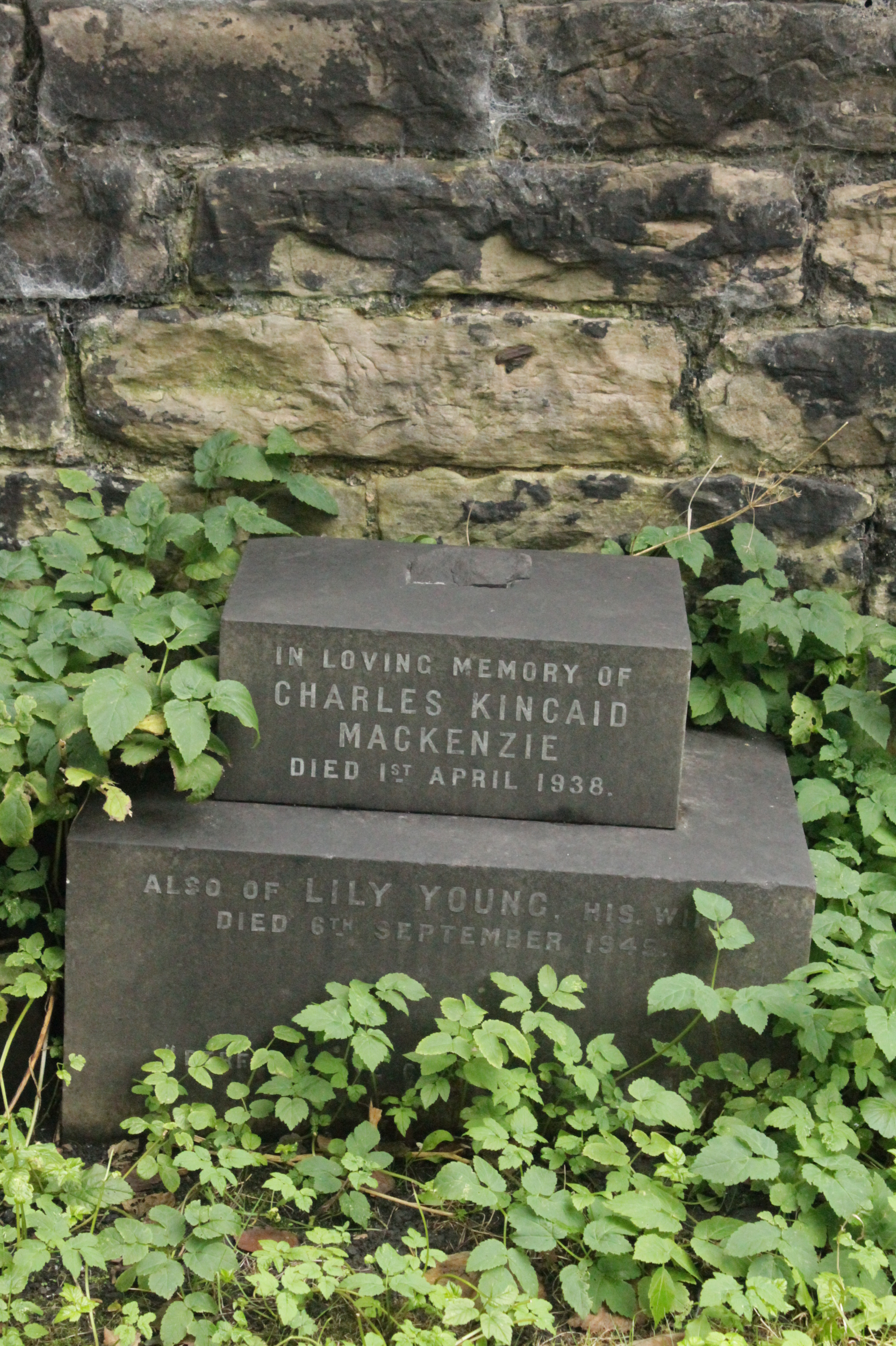
The grave of Charles Kincaid Mackenzie, St John's Churchyard, Edinburgh

He was born on 8 March 1857 the son of Alexander Kincaid Mackenzie (1812-1900).

He was educated at Edinburgh Academy then at Repton School.

He studied law at University College within Oxford University, there playing for the university cricket team in the first inter-university match against Cambridge, and graduating BA (Hons).

He was the Scottish bar in 1881 and in 1895 was living at 47 Heriot Row. He was Sheriff of Dumfries and Galloway 1899/1900 and became Sheriff of Fife and Kinross in 1901.

In 1905 he was a King's Counsel (KC).

In December 1905 he was elected a Senator of the College of Justice replacing James Adam, Lord Adam. He stepped down from this position in 1922 due to ill health.

He died in his Heriot Row home in Edinburgh on 1 April 1938. He is buried in the churchyard of St John's, Edinburgh on Princes Street, close to his home on Heriot Row.

== Family ==
He married Lillian (Lily) Young (1854-1945) of Gullane, daughter of George Young, Lord Young, Lord Advocate of Scotland, on 19 April 1881.

Their only son, Mark Kincaid Mackenzie (1888-1914), played first-class cricket for Oxford University and was killed in the First Battle of the Aisne during the First World War.
