= Neil Douglas Findlay =

British Army general

Brigadier-General Neil Douglas Findlay CB
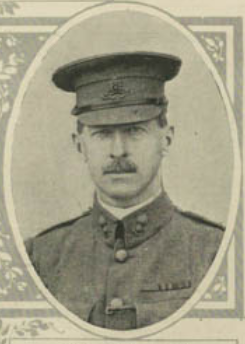
- Born: 7 May 1859; Lanarkshire, Scotland
- Died: 10 September 1914 (aged 55) near Priez, France
- Burial place: Vailly British Cemetery
- Military career
- Allegiance: United Kingdom
- Branch: British Army
- Service years: 1878–1914
- Rank: Brigadier-General
- Unit: Royal Artillery
- Commands: Commander, Royal Artillery, 1st Division
- Conflicts: Hazara Expedition of 1888; Second Boer War; First World War †
- Awards: Companion of the Order of the Bath; Mentioned in Despatches

Brigadier-General Neil Douglas Findlay CB (7 May 1859 – 10 September 1914) was a British Army general. A Royal Artillery officer, Findlay served in action on the Hazara Expedition of 1888 and in the Second Boer War. He was commended by General Redvers Buller for his actions during the latter and subsequently became a staff officer. After the outbreak of the First World War Findlay was promoted to brigadier general and appointed Commander, Royal Artillery of the 1st Infantry Division. Whilst serving in this capacity during the First Battle of the Aisne Findlay was hit by shrapnel from a German shell and killed. He was the first British general to be killed in the war.

== Early career ==
Findlay was born on 7 May 1859 in Lanarkshire, Scotland, the son of Thomas Dunlop Findlay of Easter Hill. He entered the Royal Military Academy, Woolwich as a gentleman cadet in January 1878 and was commissioned as a lieutenant in the Royal Artillery on 18 December 1878. Findlay was promoted to captain on 23 July 1887 and served in the Hazara Expedition of 1888 in British India where he was mentioned in despatches. He had spent some time at the Staff College, Camberley prior to the Hazara Expedition.

On 1 March 1894, Findlay was made adjutant. He was promoted to the rank of major on 21 December 1896, and transferred into the Royal Field Artillery when that branch was created on 1 July 1899. He served in the Second Boer War, seeing action in Natal and Transvaal and taking part in the Relief of Ladysmith. Findlay commanded Lieutenant-General Redvers Buller's ammunition column and was mentioned in despatches on two occasions. He received the Queen's South Africa Medal with six clasps for his participation in the campaign.

Buller was impressed with Findlay's performance, and stated that he considered

"Major Findlay one of the best Officers I met. He was an admirable commander of an Ammunition Column, loaded with ammunition of many different natures. His batteries were complete every night, and he never made a mistake. He has all the qualifications for the staff and for high command, and I desire to bring his name most prominently to your notice as deserving of all consideration."

Shortly after this commendation was published in the London Gazette on 8 February 1901 Findlay was appointed a staff officer (on 5 March), serving as a brigade major with a Royal Artillery unit.

== Staff officer ==
Findlay was promoted to brevet lieutenant colonel on 29 November 1900 and served as brigade major of the artillery of the I Army Corps until 15 April 1904. He was succeeded in that post by John Du Cane, who would later serve as a Royal Field Artillery general in the First World War, and afterwards became Master-General of the Ordnance. Findlay was promoted to lieutenant colonel on 1 September 1904, and was appointed a Companion of the Order of the Bath (military division) in the 1905 Birthday Honours on 30 June 1905.

Findlay was promoted to brevet colonel on 15 October 1905 and to colonel on 2 March 1908. His replacement following the latter appointment was Alexander Hamilton-Gordon, who later commanded a corps in the First World War.

Findlay served as assistant adjutant general at the War Office until 14 July 1910 when he was appointed to command the artillery of the 1st Division, then stationed at Aldershot, taking over from Colonel Benjamin Burton. He was granted the rank of brigadier general, although this was only a temporary rank and only lasted whilst he held this appointment.

== First World War ==
Findlay was promoted to brigadier general on 25 August 1914, shortly after the outbreak of the First World War on 28 July 1914. He served with the 1st Division in France as Commander, Royal Artillery and fought with them at the First Battle of the Aisne.

German forces held the high ground on the east of the Aisne valley and a Franco-British offensive was planned to dislodge them. British forces advanced at dawn on 10 September to attempt a river crossing at Venizel in support of French forces fighting at Soissons. A French Zouave unit simultaneously crossed at Villesur Aigue to threaten the German right flank. The British troops encountered heavy resistance from the German rearguard, an all-arms force which was holding a ridgeline near Preuil, and the British artillery, commanded by Findlay and stationed at Priez, was brought into action.

German siege howitzers opened fire on Findlay's artillery and the road adjacent to his position, though few deaths were caused as the shrapnel shells exploded too high at 300 to 400 feet (91 to 122 m). The position was, however, in danger of being overrun by German forces and Findlay ordered his guns brought into action for immediate defence. He then approached his regimental chaplain, gave him some of his personal belongings and requested he look after them in case anything happened to him.

Findlay remained with his artillery pieces, providing advice and encouragement to the gun crews, against the advice of his staff who asked him to move to a place of safety. The British artillery was winning the artillery duel, causing the German fire to slacken and allowing the infantry to advance. At this point a parting shot from the Germans struck Findlay's horse, killing both.

Findlay was struck by shrapnel near his left eye. The German fire may have been directed at a unit of British infantry which was passing along the road adjacent to Findlay's position at the time. Findlay was selecting a new position for his guns near Torey north of Chateau Thierry when he was killed. By that afternoon the Allied infantry had successfully crossed the river and forced the Germans to retreat to Laon and La Fère.

Findlay, the first British general to be killed in the war and described as one of the army's best artillery officers, was buried at the churchyard in Courchamps under a bronze cross. His body was exhumed and moved to Vailly British Cemetery on 15 June 1938. His replacement with the 1st Division was Brigadier General Edward Fanshawe, who later became a corps commander. There is a plaque in his memory at Kenmuir Mount Vernon Church in Kenmuir near Mount Vernon, Glasgow. Findlay was married to Alma Lloyd and had two daughters.

== See also ==
- List of generals of the British Empire who died during the First World War

== Bibliography ==
- Davies, Frank (1997). Bloody Red Tabs: General Officer Casualties of the Great War 1914–1918. London: Pen & Sword Books. ISBN 978-0-85052-463-5.
