= Chemin des Dames =

Road in France

Coordinates: 49°26′35″N 3°42′37″E

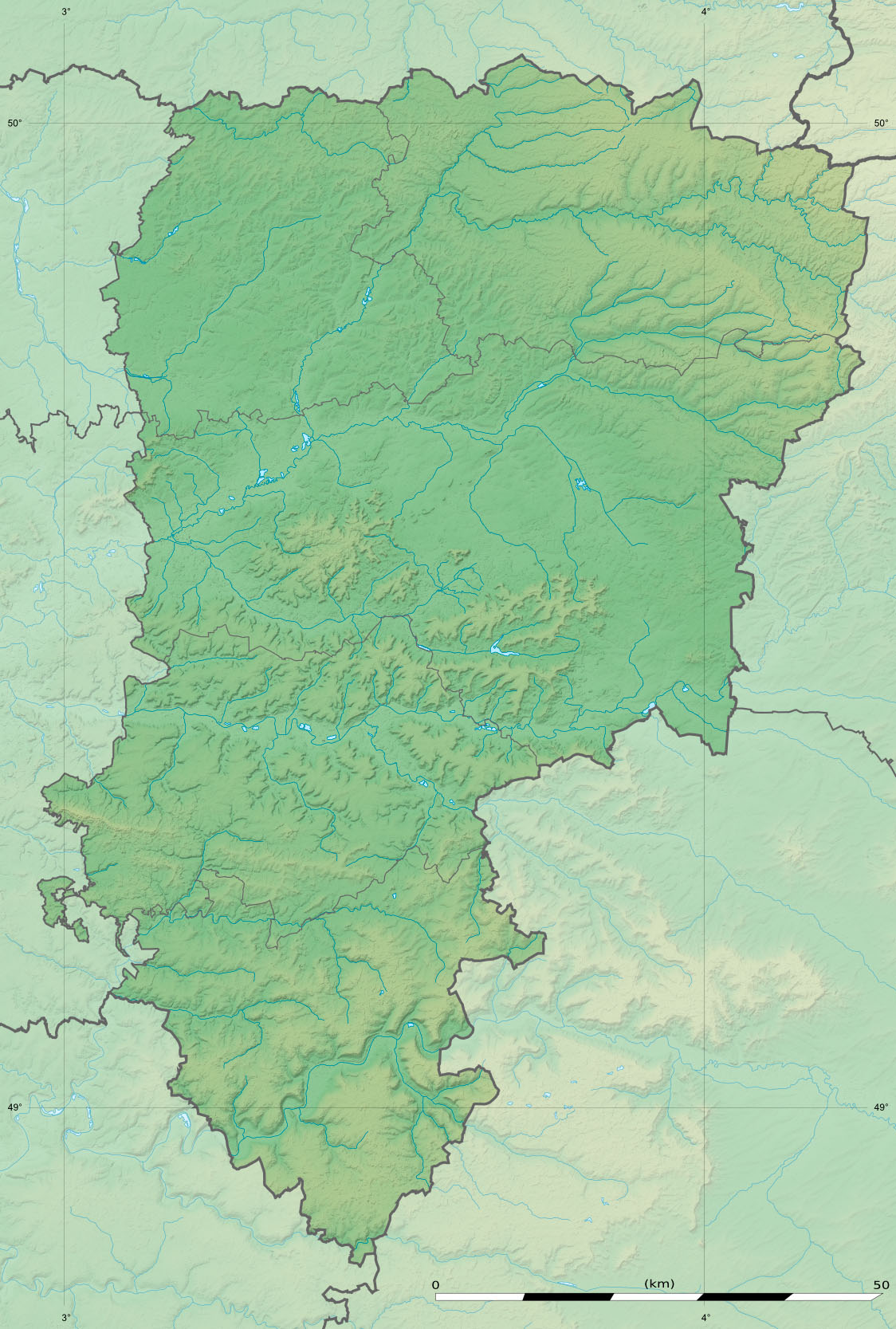
Chemin des Dames, running between Aizy-Jouy and Corbeny in the department of Aisne

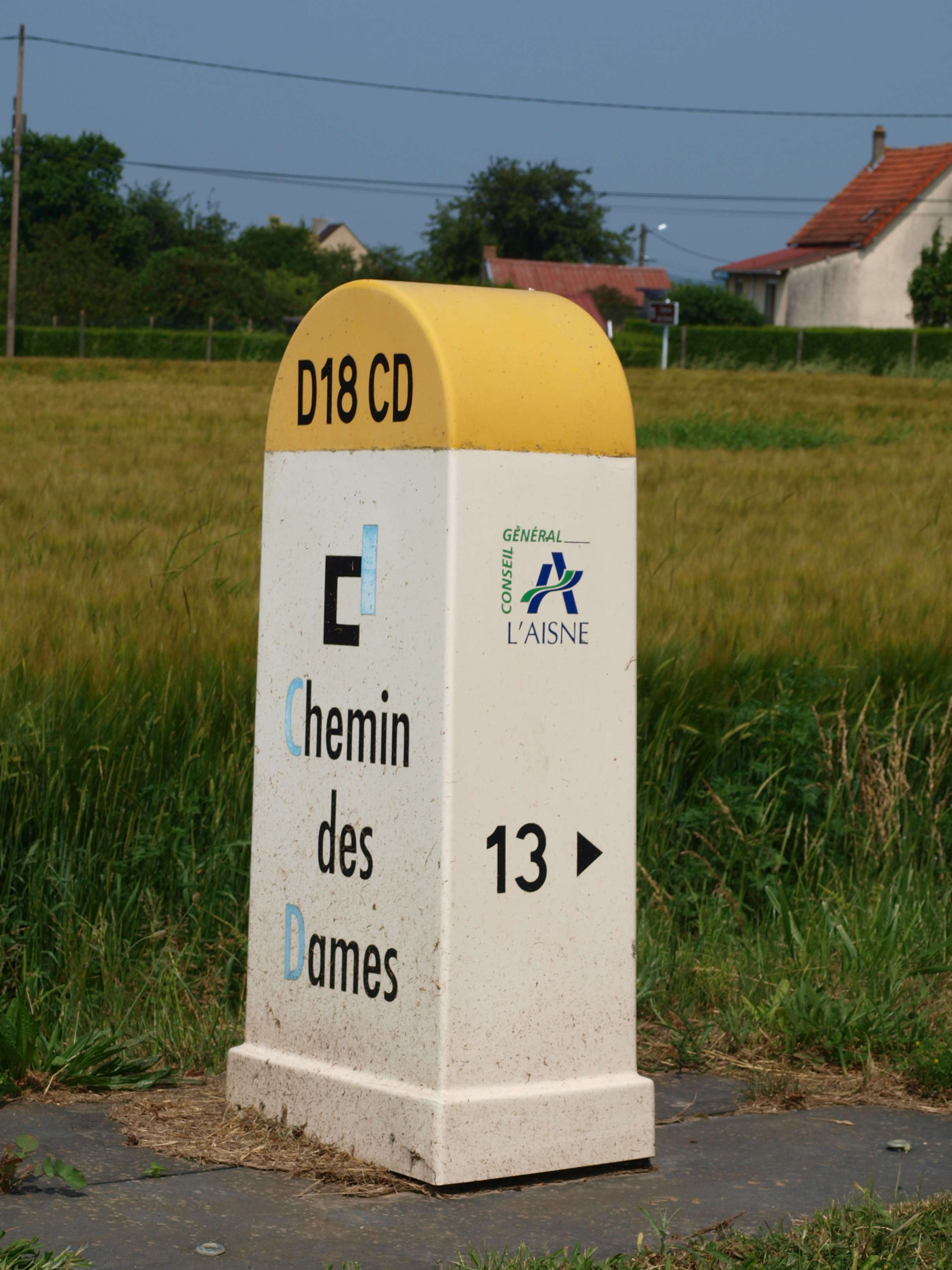
Sign on the Chemin des Dames

The Chemin des Dames ([ʃə.mɛ̃ de dam]; literally, the "ladies' path") in France is part of the route départementale (local road) D18 and runs east and west in the Aisne department, between in the west, the Route Nationale 2 (Laon to Soissons), and in the east, the D1044 at Corbeny. It is some 30 kilometres (19 mi) long and runs along a ridge between the valleys of the rivers Aisne and Ailette.

== History ==
It acquired the name in the 18th century, as it was the route taken by the two daughters of Louis XV, Adélaïde and Victoire, who were known as Mesdames de France. At the time, it was scarcely a carriage road, but it was the most direct route between Paris and the Château de la Bove, near Vauclair, on the far side of the Ailette. The château belonged to Françoise de Châlus, former mistress of Louis XV, Countess of Narbonne-Lara and former lady of honour to Adélaïde, whom the two ladies visited frequently. To make the way easier, the count had the road surfaced, and it gained its new name. The ridge's strategic importance first became evident in 1814 when Napoleon's young recruits defeated an army of Prussians and Russians at the Battle of Craonne.

=== World War I ===
Three battles were fought along the Chemin des Dames east-to-west ridge located to the north of Paris during the First World War. All are named after the river which flows on the south side of the ridge. Their names are as follows:

- First Battle of the Aisne (1914) – Anglo-French counter-offensive following the First Battle of the Marne.
- Second Battle of the Aisne (1917) – main component of the Nivelle Offensive.
- Third Battle of the Aisne (1918) – third phase (Operation Blücher) of the German spring offensive.

During World War I, the Chemin Des Dames lay in that sector of the Western Front held by the French Army. Its strategic importance made it the staging ground of several major battles that took place between 1914 and 1918. The German army took a defensive stand on the ridge in September 1914, stopping the advancing Allied armies after the Battle of the Marne. After intensive combat, Germans took control of the plateau in November 1914. The front line then remained static until March 1917, during which time several thousand soldiers died in local attacks or coup de main operations. On 25 January 1915 German forces captured the Creute farm (today La Caverne du Dragon or the Dragon's Lair), the last remaining French position on the plateau.

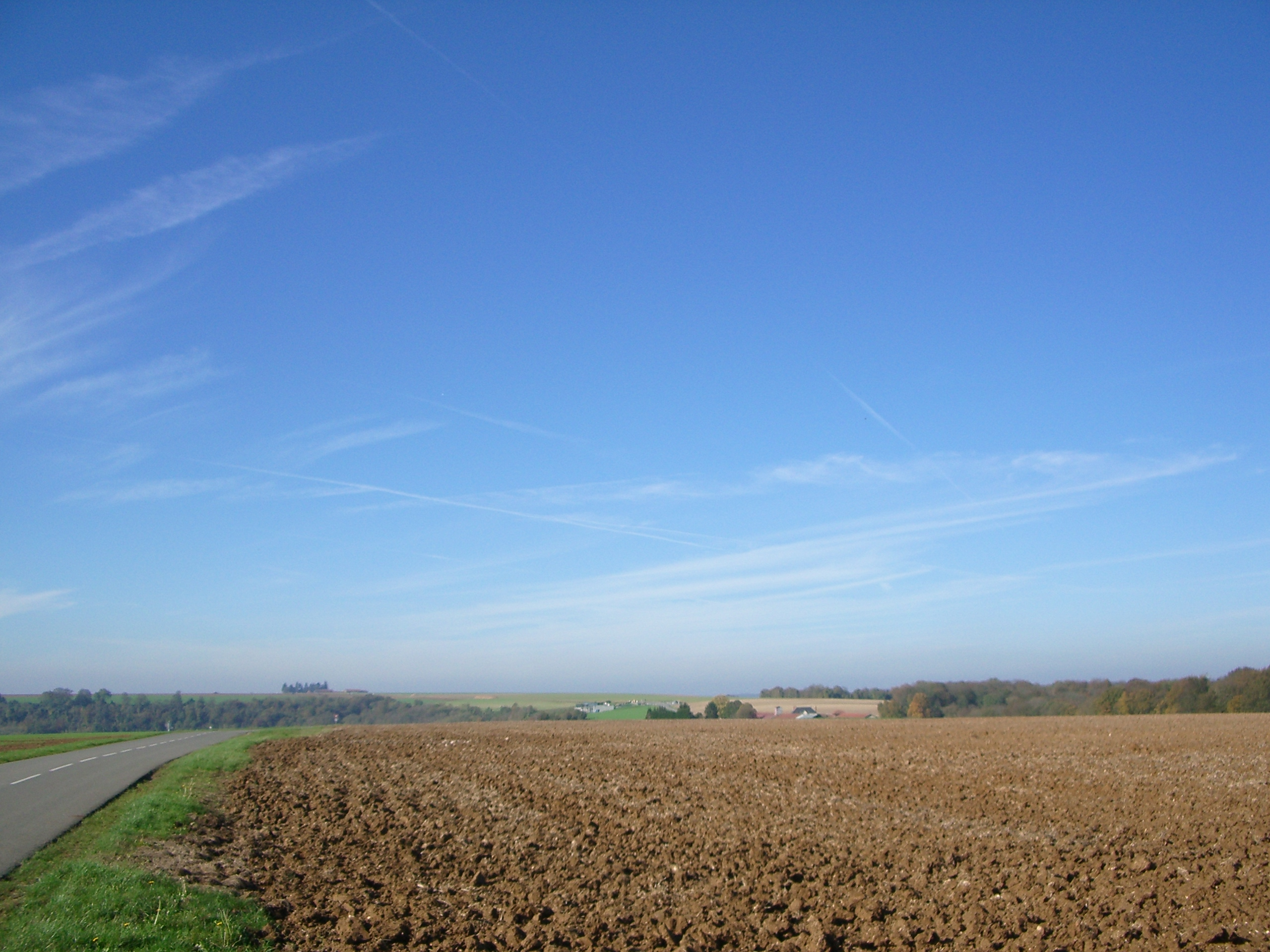
Plateau of the Chemin des Dames

The best-known battle, called the Second Battle of the Aisne, took place between 16 April and 25 April 1917. To soften up the German defences, General Robert Nivelle, an artilleryman by training and experience, inflicted a six-day artillery preparation involving 5,300 guns. This, of course, provided ample warning that a major French attack was coming. Then, on 16 April, seven French army corps attacked the German line along the Chemin des Dames ridge. But, Nivelle had underestimated the enemy's defensive preparations: The Germans had created a network of deep shelters in old underground stone quarries below the ridge, where their troops took shelter from the French barrage. The German positions also dominated the southerly slope over which the French attackers were progressing. On the first day, French infantry and some colonial Senegalese troops progressed to the top of the ridge in spite of intense German artillery counterfire and poor weather conditions. However, as French infantry reached the plateau, the advance was slowed and then stopped by the intense fire of a very high number of the Germans' new MG08/15 machine guns. As a result, the French took 40,000 casualties on the first day alone. Furthermore, during the following 12 days of the battle, French losses continued to rise to 120,000 casualties (dead, wounded, and missing). The final count, when the offensive was over, was 187,000 French casualties and 163,000 Germans casualties. The German defenders suffered much less, but lost some 20,000 prisoners, 40 cannons, and 200 machine guns. The high French casualty count, in so few days and with such minimal gains, was perceived at headquarters and by the French public as a disaster. Furthermore, the agonizingly slow evacuation of the French wounded also demonstrated a lack of logistical preparations. Nivelle had to resign, and the French Army became plagued by many refusals to march amounting to mutinies in several infantry divisions.

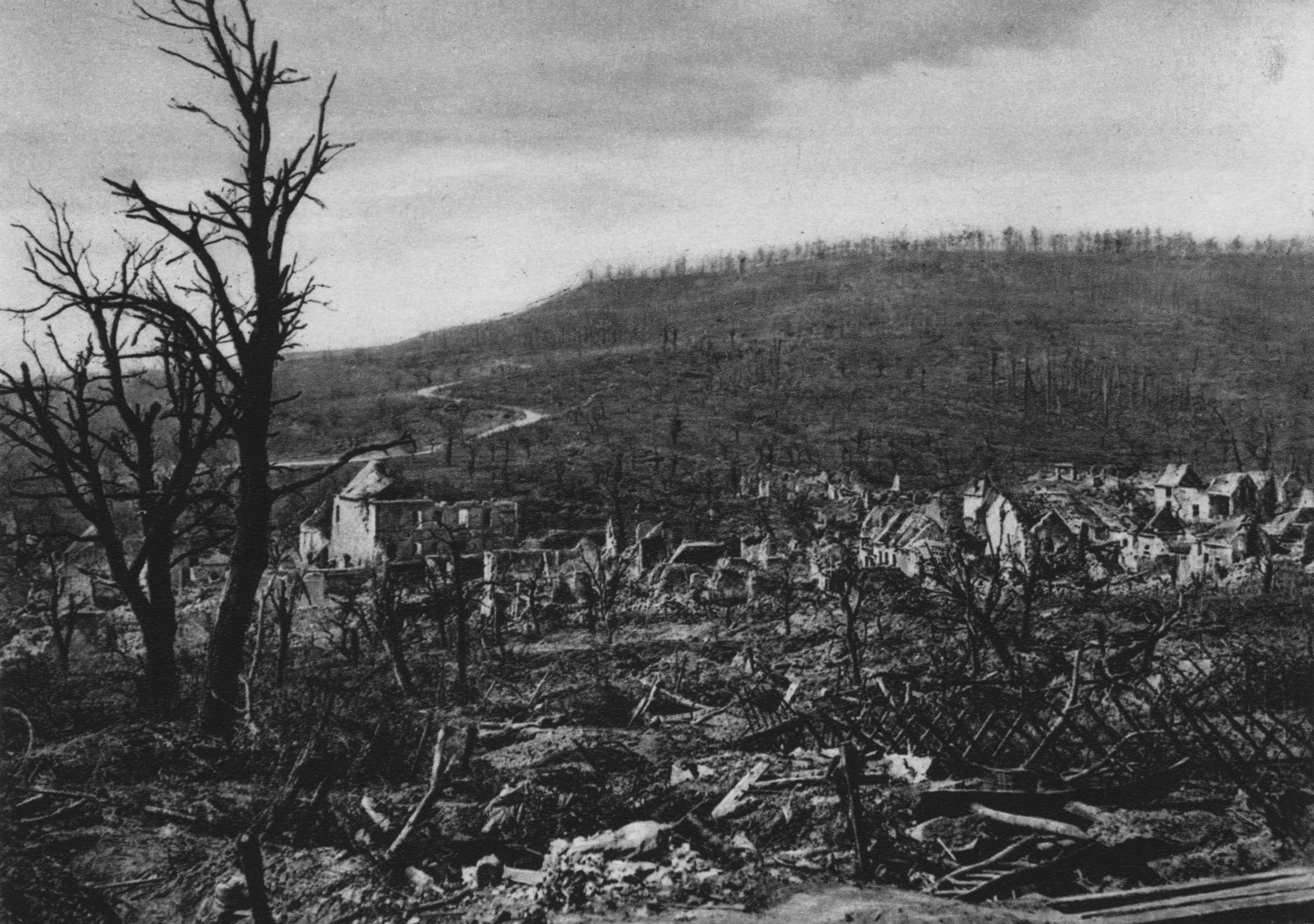
Devastated village of Soupir, May 1917

This situation developed into a threat of complete disintegration. General Philippe Pétain, who had opposed this offensive, was called in to take over from Nivelle and to re-establish order. This he did without harsh collective punishments. A total of 629 men were sentenced to death, but only 28 men, who had fired weapons at their superiors, were executed. Conversely, Pétain instituted positive changes, such as longer home leaves and better food and medical/surgical assistance for the troops. By the Summer of 1917, order had returned to the French army, which won a major victory that August on the left bank of the Meuse at Verdun, driving the Germans from the positions they had taken at such high cost there in 1916. During the summer of 1917, the Battle of the Observatories comprised a series of local attacks and counterattacks to gain control of high positions commanding the views between Craonne and Laffaux, in which the French improved their tactical position in the sector. In October, the crushing French victory at the Battle of La Malmaison drove German forces completely off the Chemin des Dames, forcing them North to the Ailette River valley.

The Third Battle of the Aisne came as a complete surprise to the Allies, including British troops who had been sent there to rest in a quiet sector. A German breakthrough was aided by orders of the French General Denis Auguste Duchêne to mass troops in the front line – a tactic by this date discredited and contrary to the orders of the Commander-in-Chief. The penetration broke into open country and fighting went on from 27 May to 6 June 1918, but ran out of energy owing to lack of a strategic objective and lengthening supply lines. During the Second Battle of the Marne, the last fight on the Chemin des Dames occurred between 2 August and 10 October 1918.

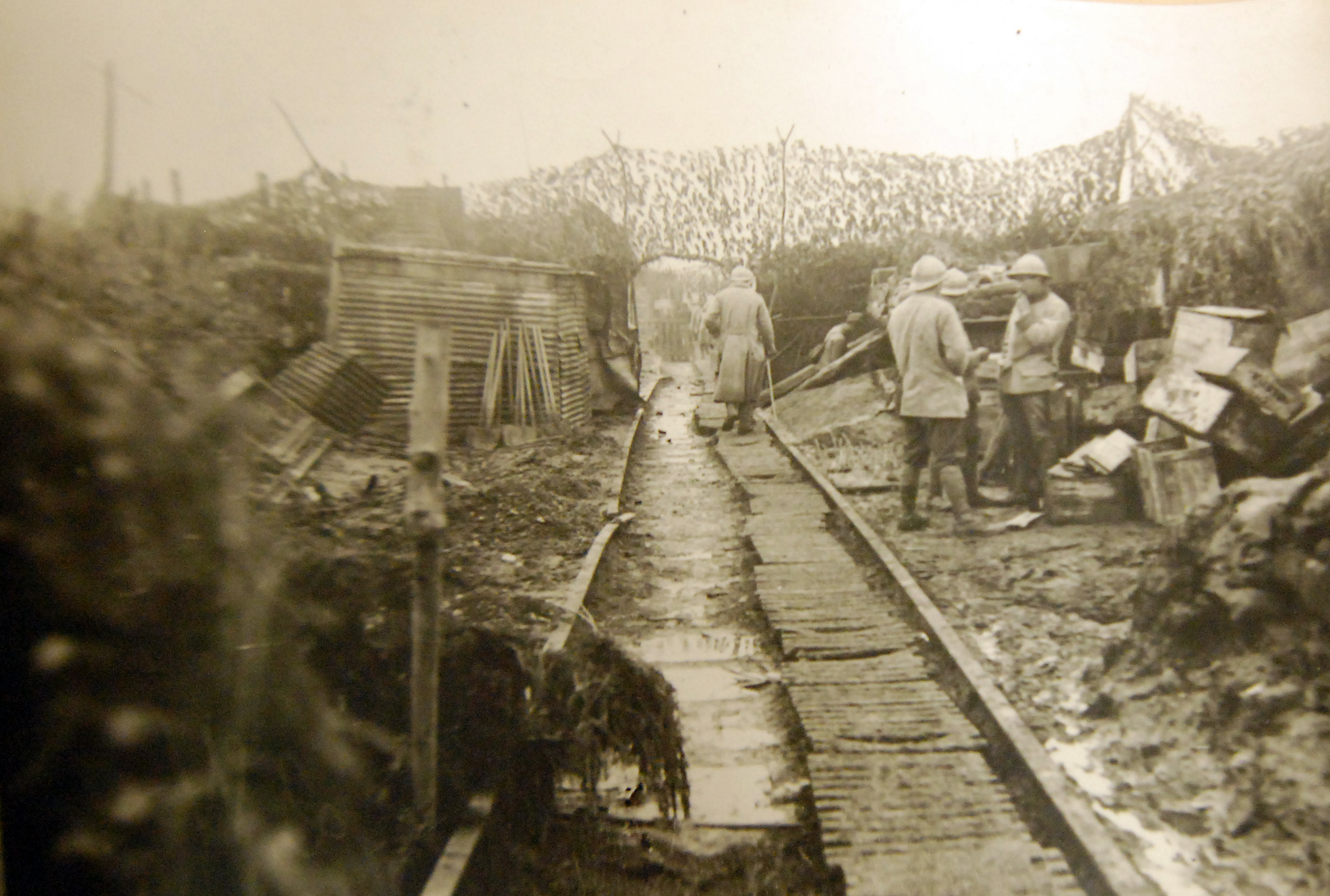
Camouflaged section of the Chemin des Dames

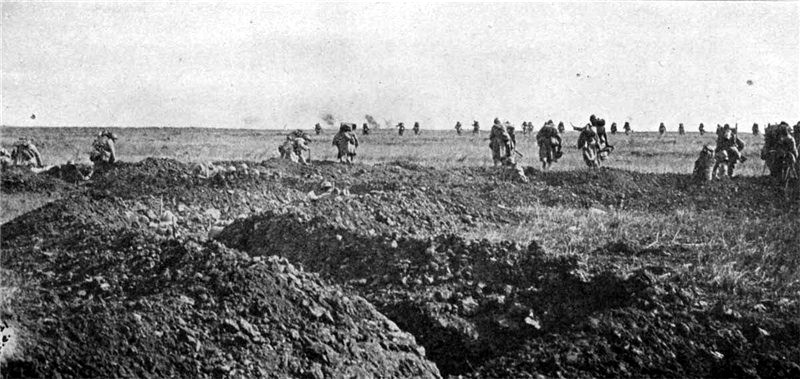
French assault on the Chemin des Dames during the Second Battle of the Aisne

=== Present ===
There are numerous war memorials and cemeteries, German, French and British, all along the chemin. Beneath the ridge is an almost square kilometre (250 acre)cave network called "The Dragon's Lair" (La Caverne du Dragon). The caverns originally were a tunnel system created from excavations of limestone for building purposes in the 17th century. The caves are some 20–40 metres (66–131 ft) below the surface. During World War I, the caves were used by both French and German forces as field hospitals and command posts, sometimes simultaneously. The artillery bombardment of the area actually cracked some of the overlying cliffs, which can be seen today. A noteworthy visitors' centre that offers guided tours is now located at the site. In January 2020, the father-son team of Alain and Pierre Malinowski discovered the entrance to the long buried tunnel. The remains of over 270 German soldiers have been recovered to date.

The route was used during Stage 6 of the 2014 Tour de France as part of the race's tribute to the men killed in the 1914–18 War.

== Cemeteries ==
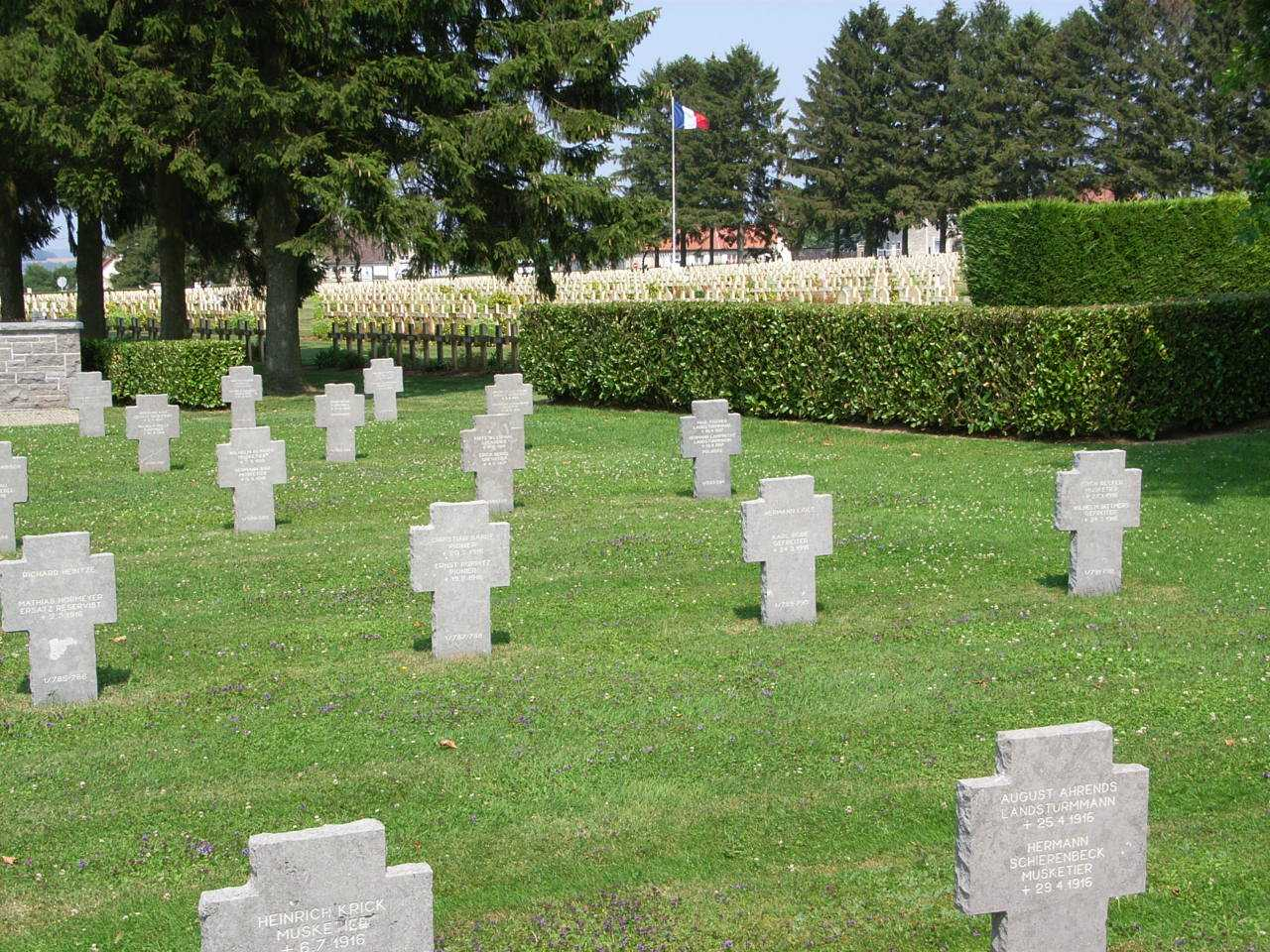
German (foreground) and French (background) cemeteries at Cerny

Approximately half of those who are buried at Chemin des Dames cemeteries could not be identified, and were interred in ossuaries or in collective graves. Note: The following list of national cemeteries does not include the names of municipal cemeteries in France holding burials of soldiers lost in the battles.

=== French national cemeteries ===
- Soupir (I & II)
- Berry-au-Bac
- Braine
- Cerny-en-Laonnois
- Craonnelle
- Crouy
- Oeuilly
- Pontavert
- Vailly-sur-Aisne
- Vauxaillon
- Vauxbuin

=== German national cemeteries ===
- Cerny-en-Laonnois
- Laon "Bousson"
- Laon "Champ de Manoeuvre"
- Montaigu (I & II)
- Mons-en-Laonnois
- Soupir
- Sissonne
- Veslud

=== British national cemeteries ===
- Soupir
- Seraucourt-le-Grand "Grand Seraucourt"
- Montcornet
- Sissonne
- Vailly British Cemetery
- Vendresse-Beaulne
- La Ville-aux-Bois-les-Pontavert

=== Italian national cemetery ===
- Soupir

=== Other national cemetery sections ===
- Denmark: section in the French National Cemetery at Braine
- United States: section of Oise-Aisne American Cemetery and Memorial near Fère-en-Tardenois
