= Theodore Wright =

English Victoria Cross recipient (1883–1914)

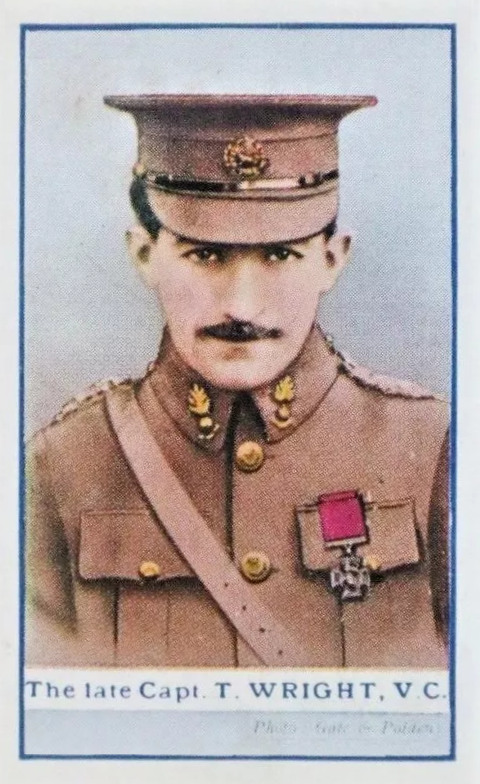
- Wright on a cigarette card
- Born: 15 May 1883; Brighton, East Sussex, England
- Died: 14 September 1914 (aged 31); Vailly, France
- Burial place: Vailly British Cemetery, Vailly, France
- Military career
- Allegiance: United Kingdom
- Branch: British Army
- Service years: 1902–1914
- Rank: Captain
- Units: Royal Engineers
- Conflicts: World War I
- Awards: Victoria Cross

Captain Theodore Wright, VC (15 May 1883 – 14 September 1914) was a British Army officer and an English recipient of the Victoria Cross (VC), the highest and most prestigious award for gallantry in the face of the enemy that can be awarded to British and Commonwealth forces.

== Details ==
Wright was born in May 1883 in Brighton, and received his education from Clifton College and the Royal Military Academy at Woolwich. He was commissioned into the Royal Engineers as a second lieutenant on 1 October 1902 and promoted to captain in October 1913.

He was thirty one years old, and a captain in the 57th Field Company, Corps of Royal Engineers, British Army during the First World War when the following deed took place for which he was awarded the VC.

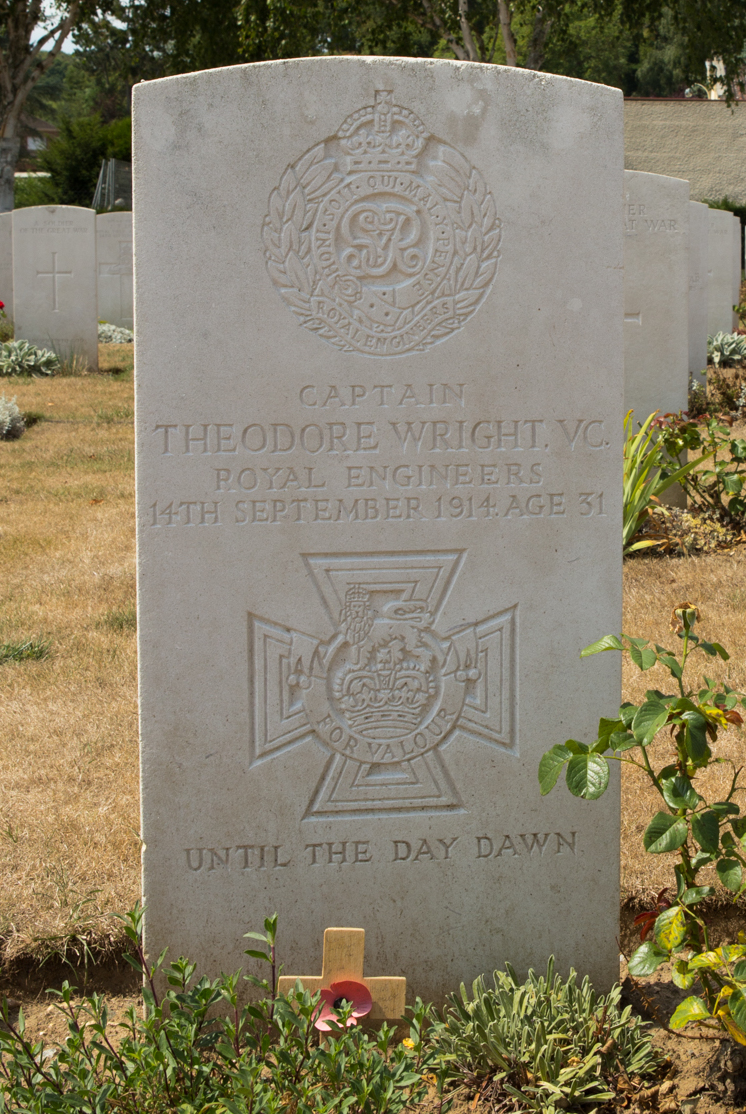
Wright's gravestone at Vailly British Cemetery.

On 23 August 1914 at Jemappes, Mons, Belgium, a company of the Royal Scots Fusiliers were holding a barricade at the north end of a bridge over the Mons-Condé canal. By this time the firing on the position had become so violent and the casualties were so numerous that a retirement had been decided on. Lance-Corporal Charles Jarvis, of the Royal Engineers was then called upon to destroy the bridge but was without the exploder and leads. It was then that he met Captain Theodore Wright, who had been wounded in the head, who told him to go back to the bridge and he would bring the necessary equipment.

It was whilst attempting to connect the leads under the bridge to blow it that Theodore Wright earned his Victoria Cross. Time and again he tried to get at the end of the leads but each time he raised his head above the level of the towpath he was fired upon from about thirty yards off. Eventually he gave up the attempt and in swinging himself back under the girder of the bridge he lost his grip and owing to exhaustion fell into the canal, and was pulled out by a Sergeant Smith. (Corporal Alfred Jarvis was also awarded the Victoria Cross for this action).

At Vailly, Aube, on 14 September 1914, Theodore Wright assisted the passage of the 5th Cavalry Brigade over a pontoon bridge, and was mortally wounded whilst assisting wounded men into shelter. An officer of the Scots Greys wrote in a letter later "We got across the river the day before yesterday a bit before our time and we had to go back over a pontoon bridge considerably quicker than was pleasant, under a very heavy fire too. At the end of the bridge was an Engineer officer repairing bits blown off and putting down straw as cool as a cucumber – the finest thing I ever saw. The poor fellow was killed just after my troops got across. No man earned a better Victoria Cross."

Wright's citation in the London Gazette read:

Gallantry at Mons on 23rd August in attempting to connect up the lead to demolish a bridge under heavy fire; although wounded in the head he made a second attempt. At Vailly, on 14th September, he assisted the passage of 5th Cavalry Brigade over the pontoon bridge and was mortally wounded whilst assisting wounded men into shelter.

Wright is buried at the Vailly British Cemetery, France.

== The medal ==
His medals are displayed at the Royal Engineers Museum in Gillingham, Kent.

== Bibliography ==
- Gliddon, Gerald (2011) [1994]. 1914. VCs of the First World War. The History Press. ISBN 978-0752459080.
- Napier, Gerald (1998). The Sapper VCs: The Story of Valour in the Royal Engineers and Its Associated Corps. The Stationery Office. ISBN 978-0117728356.
