= Edouard Cibot =

French long-distance runner (1883–1917)

- Cibot in 1910

Personal information
- Nationality: France
- Born: 16 April 1917 Guéret, France
- Died: 16 April 1917 (aged 34) Soupir, France
- Height: 173 cm (5 ft 8 in)

Cibot after winning the 5000 metres at the Vélodrome d'Hiver in 1907

Edouard Cibot (3 April 1883 – 16 April 1917) was a French long-distance and marathon runner. He won the professional Paris Marathon in 1903. He held the record of 2:34:50 in a competitive marathon at a certified race as of 1909.

== Biography ==
Cibot was born on 3 April 1883 in Guéret. He competed as a professional athlete. Cibot competed in the 1900 Summer Olympics in the professional 6-hour race. His best-known victory was winning the professional 1903 Paris Marathon at the time called the "Conflans to Paris Marathon". He won the race on 4 August 1903 in a time of 2:34:50. There was also an amateur race that was won by Georges Daunis-Touquet.

He won the 5000 metres at the Vélodrome d'Hiver on 10 February 1907 ahead of Millot. And later the year also competed in Rouen-Paris.

He also competed outside France. For instance he competed at a marathon at Polo Grounds, New York in 1909.

In 1910 he finished second in Paris-Reims. He remained active until at least 1913.
