= Vailly, Aube =

Commune in Grand Est, France

Vailly
- Commune
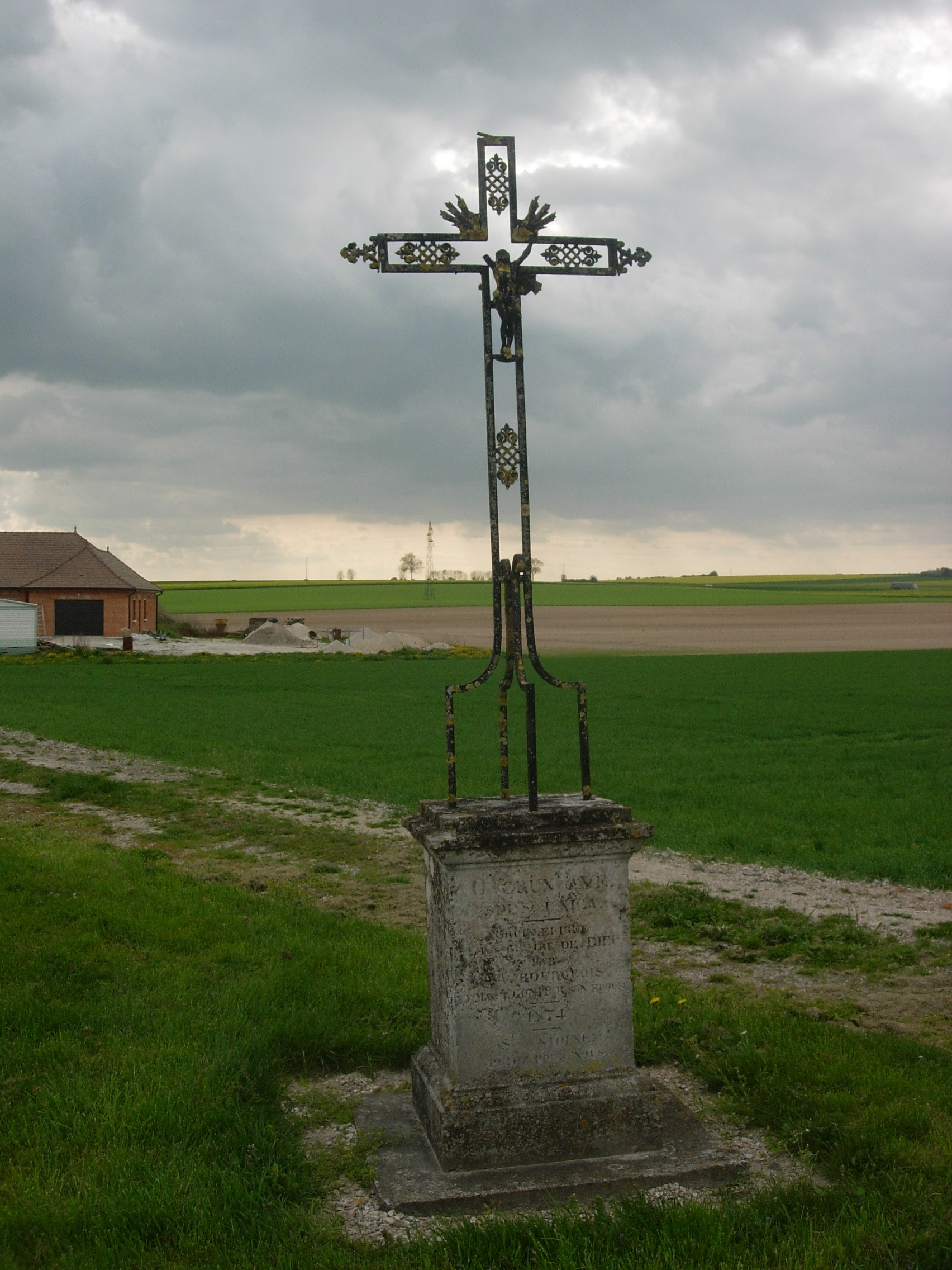
- Roadside cross
- Location of Vailly
- Location within France Location within Grand Est
- Coordinates: 48°22′13″N 4°07′21″E
- Country: France
- Region: Grand Est
- Department: Aube
- Arrondissement: Troyes
- Canton: Creney-près-Troyes
- Intercommunality: CA Troyes Champagne Métropole

Government
  - Mayor (2020–2026): William Handel
- Area^{1}: 11.25 km^{2} (4.34 sq mi)
- Elevation: 141 m (463 ft)
- Highest elevation: 215 m (705 ft)
- Lowest elevation: 123 m (404 ft)
- Population (2023): 329
  - Density: 29.2/km^{2} (75.7/sq mi)
- Time zone: UTC+01:00 (CET)
  - Summer (DST): UTC+02:00 (CEST)
- INSEE/Postal code: 10391 /10150
- ^{1} French Land Register data, which excludes lakes, ponds, glaciers > 1 km^{2} (0.386 sq mi or 247 acres) and river estuaries.

Vailly (French pronunciation: [vaji]) is a commune in the Aube department in north-central France.

== Population ==
Historical population
Year	Pop.	±% p.a.
1968	130	—
1975	177	+4.51%
1982	291	+7.36%
1990	280	−0.48%
1999	247	−1.38%
2007	268	+1.03%
2012	311	+3.02%
2017	287	−1.59%
2023	329	+2.30%
Source: INSEE

== See also ==
- Communes of the Aube department
