= Vailly-sur-Aisne =

- Commune
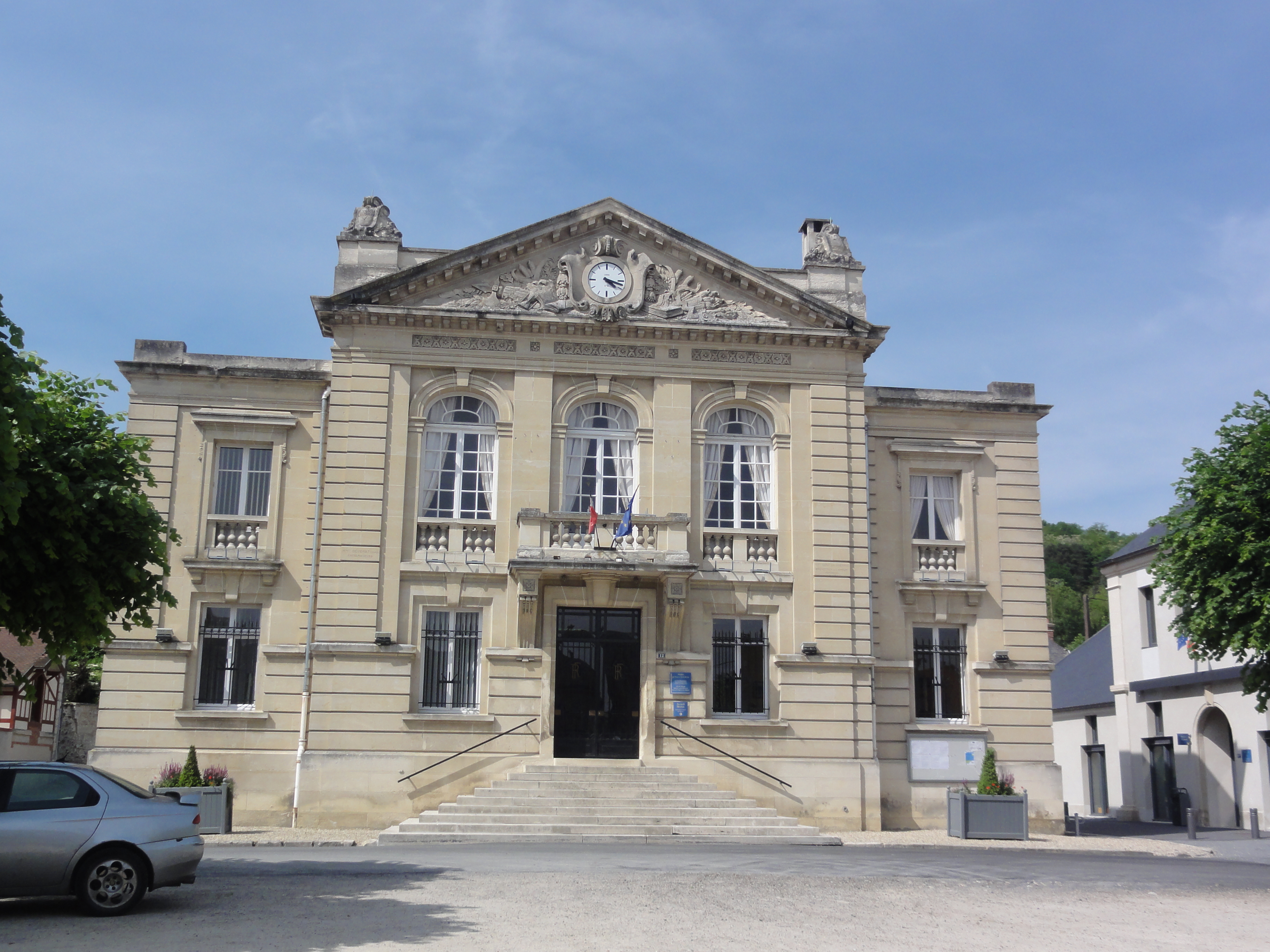
- Town hall

- Coat of arms
- Location of Vailly-sur-Aisne
- Location within France Location within Hauts-de-France
- Coordinates: 49°24′36″N 3°31′02″E
- Country: France
- Region: Hauts-de-France
- Department: Aisne
- Arrondissement: Soissons
- Canton: Fère-en-Tardenois
- Intercommunality: Val de l'Aisne

Government
  - Mayor (2026–32): Arnaud Battefort
- Area^{1}: 9.97 km^{2} (3.85 sq mi)
- Elevation: 42 m (138 ft)
- Highest elevation: 192 m (630 ft)
- Lowest elevation: 42 m (138 ft)
- Population (2023): 2,050
  - Density: 206/km^{2} (533/sq mi)
- Time zone: UTC+01:00 (CET)
  - Summer (DST): UTC+02:00 (CEST)
- INSEE/Postal code: 02758 /02370
- ^{1} French Land Register data, which excludes lakes, ponds, glaciers > 1 km^{2} (0.386 sq mi or 247 acres) and river estuaries.

Vailly-sur-Aisne (French pronunciation: [vɛli syʁ ɛːn]) is a commune in the Aisne department in Hauts-de-France in northern France.

The Commonwealth War Graves Commission maintains a cemetery, Vailly British Cemetery, at Vailly-sur-Aisne.

The town, derives its name from the Aisne, which flows just south of downtown. It is located around 13 kilometers from Soissons and 100 kilometers from Paris.

== Population ==
Historical population
Year	Pop.	±% p.a.
1968	1,830	—
1975	1,855	+0.19%
1982	1,883	+0.21%
1990	1,980	+0.63%
1999	2,081	+0.55%
2007	2,089	+0.05%
2012	2,055	−0.33%
2017	2,003	−0.51%
2023	2,050	+0.39%
Source: INSEE

== See also ==
- Communes of the Aisne department
