= Priez =

- Commune
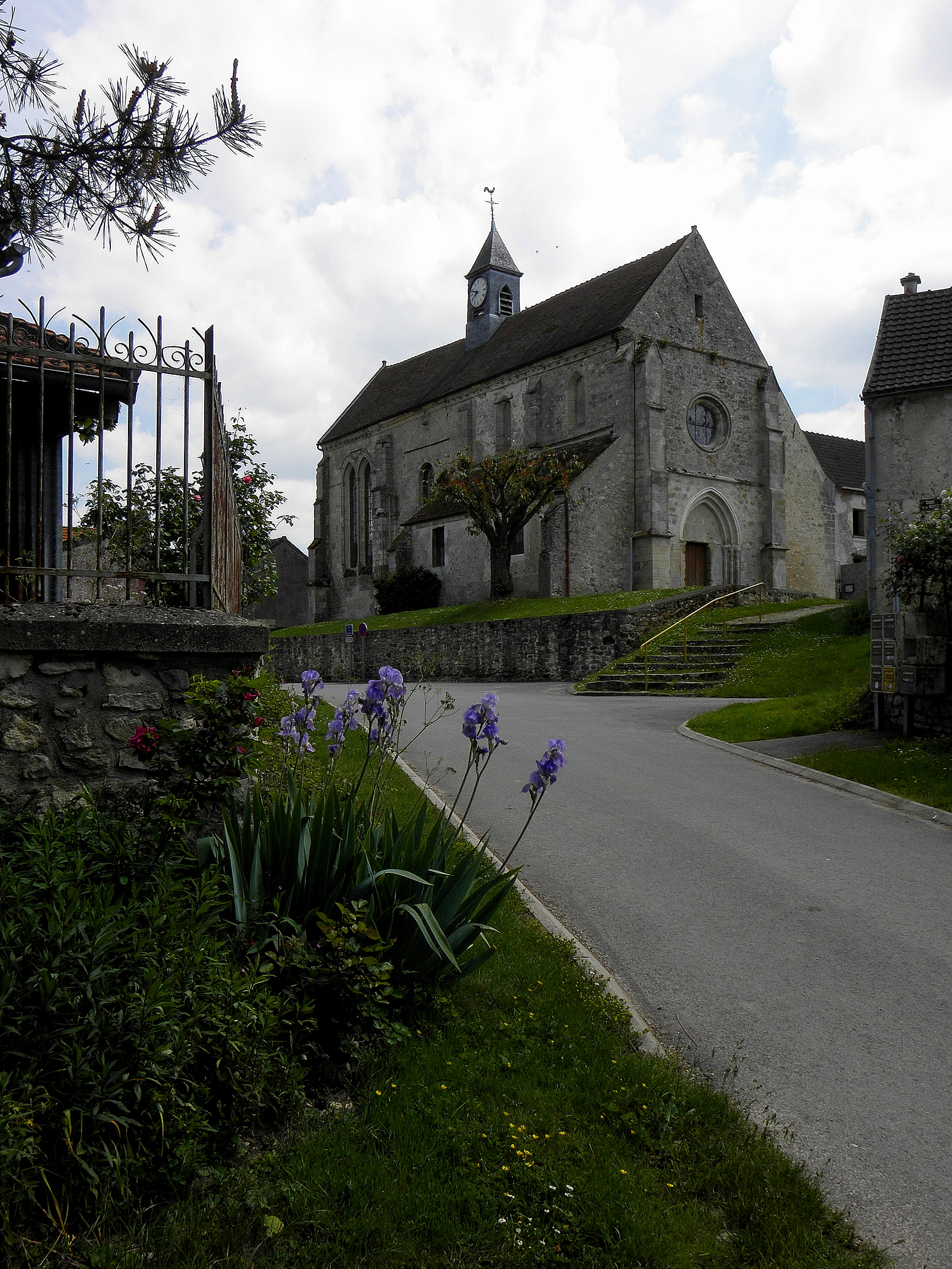
- The church of Priez
- Location of Priez
- Location within France Location within Hauts-de-France
- Coordinates: 49°08′16″N 3°15′49″E
- Country: France
- Region: Hauts-de-France
- Department: Aisne
- Arrondissement: Château-Thierry
- Canton: Villers-Cotterêts
- Intercommunality: CA Région de Château-Thierry

Government
  - Mayor (2026–32): Yves Bahu
- Area^{1}: 4.93 km^{2} (1.90 sq mi)
- Elevation: 105 m (344 ft)
- Highest elevation: 179 m (587 ft)
- Lowest elevation: 115 m (377 ft)
- Population (2023): 56
  - Density: 11/km^{2} (29/sq mi)
- Time zone: UTC+01:00 (CET)
  - Summer (DST): UTC+02:00 (CEST)
- INSEE/Postal code: 02622 /02470
- ^{1} French Land Register data, which excludes lakes, ponds, glaciers > 1 km^{2} (0.386 sq mi or 247 acres) and river estuaries.

Priez (French pronunciation: [pʁije]) is a commune in the Aisne department in Hauts-de-France in northern France.

== Population ==
Historical population
Year	Pop.	±% p.a.
1968	78	—
1975	53	−5.37%
1982	48	−1.41%
1990	36	−3.53%
1999	47	+3.01%
2007	48	+0.26%
2012	55	+2.76%
2017	52	−1.12%
2023	56	+1.24%
Source: INSEE

== See also ==
- Communes of the Aisne department
