= Vailly British Cemetery =

War cemetery in Aisne, France

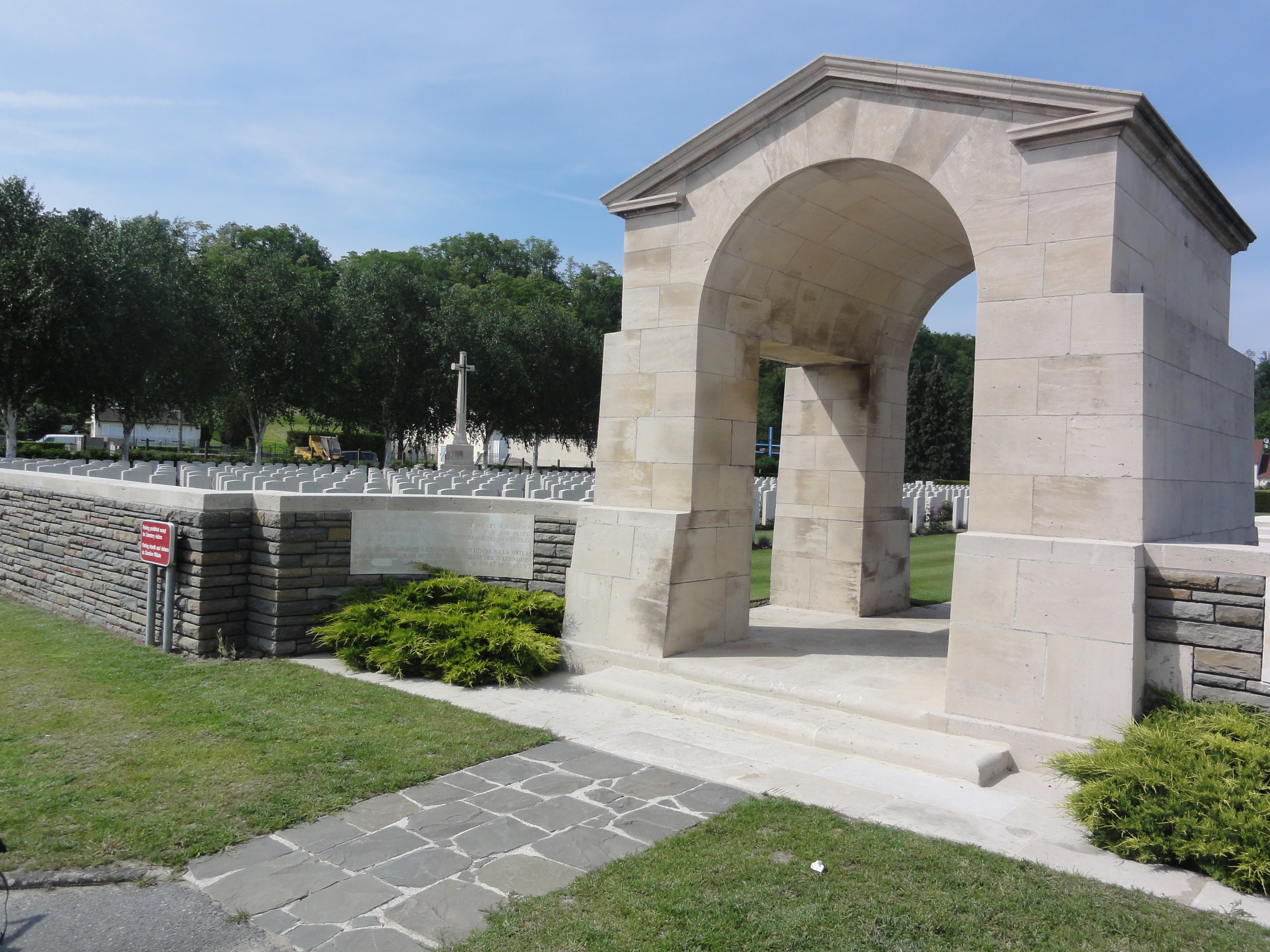
- Cemetery Entrance
- Interactive map of Vailly British Cemetery

Details
- Location: Vailly-sur-Aisne
- Country: France
- Coordinates: 49.4088°N 3.5094°E
- Type: War cemetery
- Owned by: Commonwealth War Graves Commission
- No. of graves: 369 (identified)
- Website: Cemetery details. Commonwealth War Graves Commission.
- Find a Grave: Vailly British Cemetery

Vailly British Cemetery is a war cemetery at Vailly-sur-Aisne, France, maintained by the Commonwealth War Graves Commission.

Most of the men interred at Vailly were killed in the Battle of the Aisne in September 1914.

Theodore Wright (1883–1914), recipient of the Victoria Cross, is buried here.
