= Soupir =

- Commune
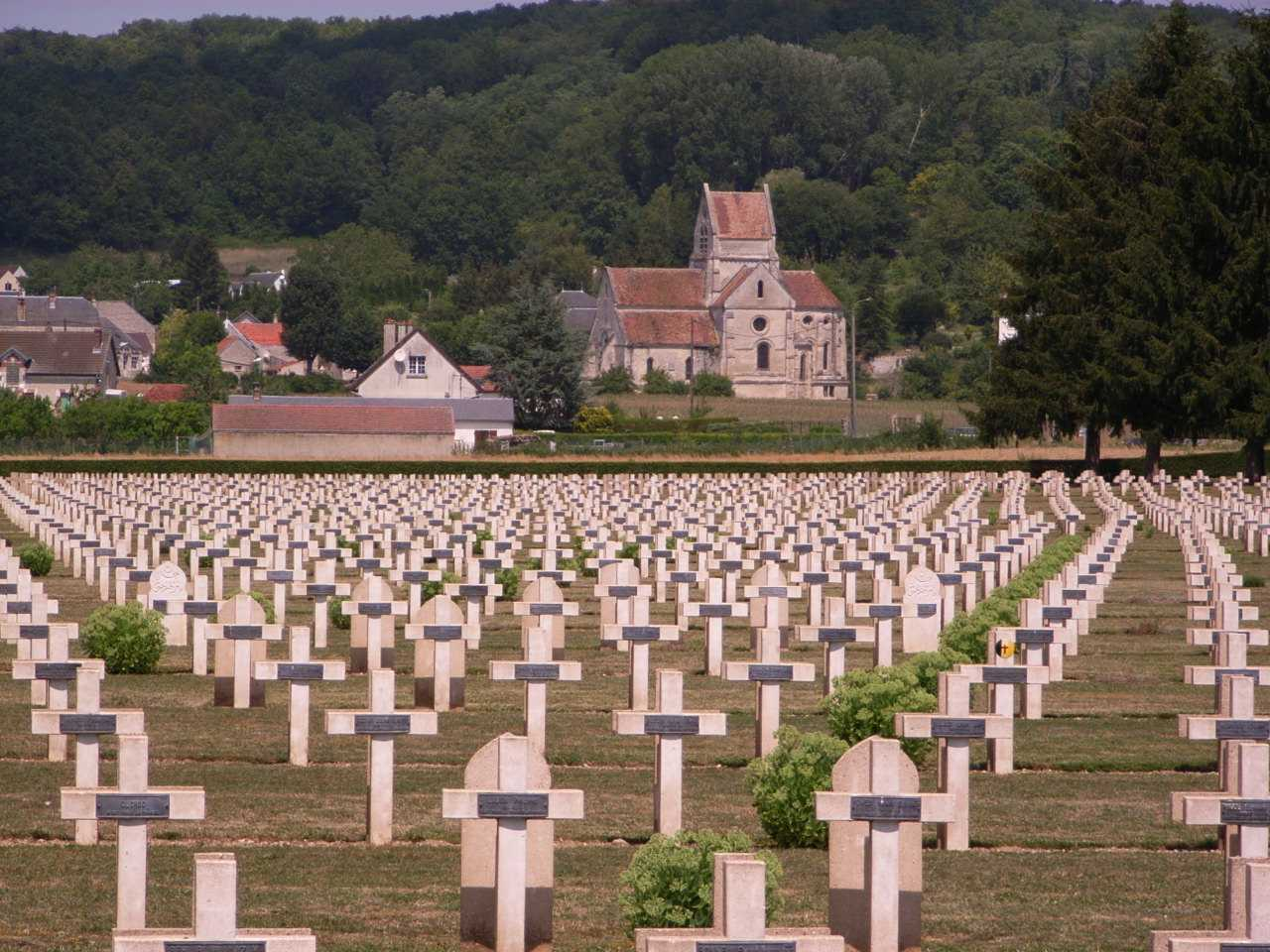
- Church and a French military cemetery in Soupir

- Coat of arms
- Location of Soupir
- Location within France Location within Hauts-de-France
- Coordinates: 49°24′25″N 3°35′50″E
- Country: France
- Region: Hauts-de-France
- Department: Aisne
- Arrondissement: Soissons
- Canton: Fère-en-Tardenois
- Intercommunality: Val de l'Aisne

Government
  - Mayor (2026–32): Evelyne Libregs
- Area^{1}: 10.2 km^{2} (3.9 sq mi)
- Elevation: 65 m (213 ft)
- Highest elevation: 190 m (620 ft)
- Lowest elevation: 42 m (138 ft)
- Population (2023): 272
  - Density: 26.7/km^{2} (69.1/sq mi)
- Time zone: UTC+01:00 (CET)
  - Summer (DST): UTC+02:00 (CEST)
- INSEE/Postal code: 02730 /02160
- ^{1} French Land Register data, which excludes lakes, ponds, glaciers > 1 km^{2} (0.386 sq mi or 247 acres) and river estuaries.

Soupir (French pronunciation: [supiʁ]) is a commune in the Aisne department in Hauts-de-France in northern France.

== History ==
Located south of the Chemin des Dames, the village was largely destroyed during the Second Battle of the Aisne in World War I. Today, five national cemeteries are located in Soupir: two for France, and one each for Germany, the UK, and Italy.

== Population ==
Historical population
Year	Pop.	±% p.a.
1968	307	—
1975	283	−1.16%
1982	289	+0.30%
1990	287	−0.09%
1999	282	−0.20%
2007	306	+1.03%
2012	288	−1.21%
2017	273	−1.06%
2023	272	−0.06%
Source: INSEE

== See also ==
- Communes of the Aisne department
