= First Battle of the Aisne =

1914 battle on the Western Front of World War I

- Part of the Western Front of World War I
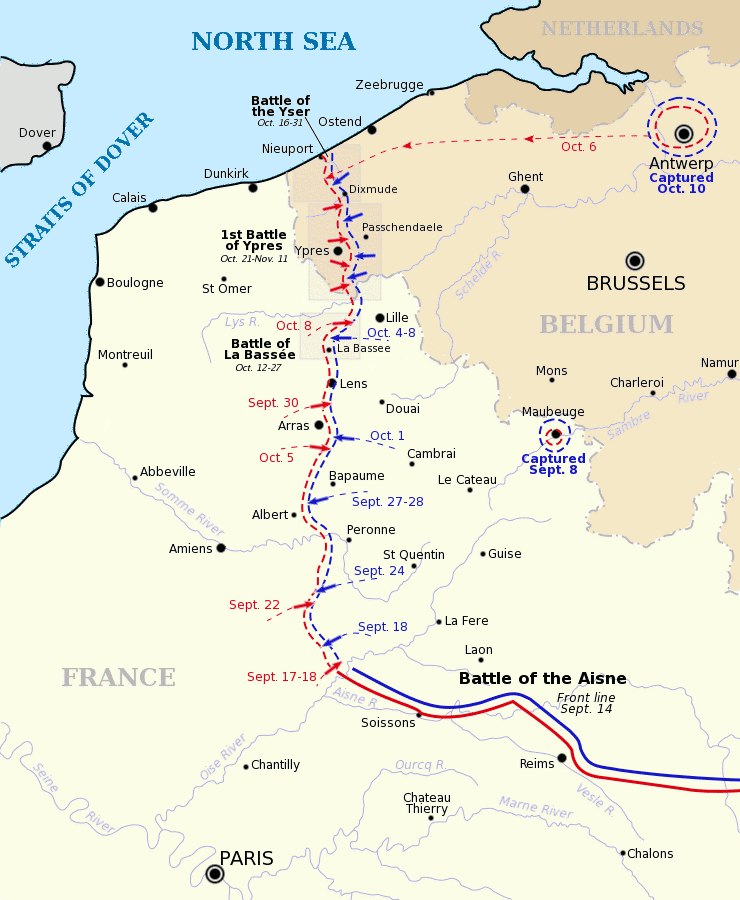
- Map of the Western Front and the Race to the Sea, 1914
Date	13–28 September 1914
Location	Aisne River, France 49°26′N 3°40′E
Result	Indecisive

Belligerents
(French Third Republic) France (United Kingdom of Great Britain and Ireland) United Kingdom	German Empire

Commanders and leaders
(French Third Republic) Michel-Joseph Maunoury (French Third Republic) Joseph Joffre (French Third Republic) Louis Franchet d'Esperey (United Kingdom of Great Britain and Ireland) John French	(German Empire) Alexander von Kluck (German Empire) Karl von Bülow (German Empire) Josias von Heeringen

Strength
(French Third Republic) Fifth Army (French Third Republic) Sixth Army (United Kingdom of Great Britain and Ireland) BEF	(German Empire) First Army (German Empire) Second Army (German Empire) Seventh Army

Casualties and losses
(French Third Republic) Unknown (United Kingdom of Great Britain and Ireland) 13,541 killed or wounded	Unknown

The First Battle of the Aisne (French: 1ère Bataille de l'Aisne) was the Allied follow-up offensive against the right wing of the German First Army (led by Alexander von Kluck) and the Second Army (led by Karl von Bülow) as they retreated after the First Battle of the Marne earlier in September 1914. The Advance to the Aisne (6 September – 1 October) consisted of the Battle of the Marne (7–10 September) and the Battle of the Aisne (12–15 September).

== The Battle ==
=== 12–15 September ===
When the Germans turned to face the pursuing Allies on 13 September, they held one of the most formidable positions on the Western Front. Between Compiègne and Berry-au-Bac, the Aisne River winds westward and is about 100 feet (30 m) wide, ranging from 12–15 feet (3.7–4.6 m) deep. Low-lying ground extends one mile (1.6 km) on each side, rising abruptly to a line of steep cliffs 300–400 feet (91–122 m) high, then gently levelling to a plateau. The Germans settled on the higher northern side 2 miles (3.2 km) beyond the crest, behind a dense thicket that covered the front and slope. Low crops in the unfenced countryside offered no natural concealment to the Allies. Deep, narrow paths cut into the escarpment at right angles, exposing any infiltrators to extreme hazard. The forces on the northern plateau commanded a wide field of fire.

In dense fog on the night of 13 September, most of the British Expeditionary Force (BEF) crossed the Aisne on pontoons or partially demolished bridges, landing at Bourg-et-Comin on the right and at Venizel on the left. At Chivres-Val east of Venizel, there was an escarpment the Germans had selected as their strongest position. The French Fifth Army crossed the Aisne at Berry-au-Bac and captured the eastern tip of Chemin des Dames, a steep ridge named after the royal coach road Louis XV had built for his daughters. Contact was established along the entire front. East of Chemin des Dames, the French Fourth, Fifth and Ninth armies made only negligible progress beyond the positions they had reached on 13 September. Under the thick cover of the foggy night, the BEF advanced up the narrow paths to the plateau. When the mist evaporated under a bright morning sun, they were mercilessly raked by fire from the flank. Those caught in the valley without the fog's protective shroud fared no better.

It soon became clear that neither side could budge the other and since neither chose to retreat, the impasse hardened into stalemate, that would lock the antagonists into a relatively narrow strip for the next four years. On 14 September, Sir John French ordered the entire BEF to entrench, but few entrenching tools were available. Soldiers scouted nearby farms and villages for pickaxes, spades and other implements. Without training for stationary warfare, the troops merely dug shallow pits in the soil. These were at first intended only to afford cover against enemy observation and artillery fire. Soon the trenches were deepened to about seven feet. Other protective measures included camouflage and holes cut into trench walls then braced with timber.

Trench warfare was also new for the Germans, whose training and equipment were designed for a mobile war to be won in six weeks, but they quickly adapted their weapons to the new situation. Siege howitzers now lobbed massive shells into the Allied trenches. Skillful use of trench mortars and hand and rifle grenades (first used against British troops on 27 September), enabled the Germans to inflict great losses upon Allied troops, who had neither been trained nor equipped with these weapons. Searchlights, flares and periscopes were also part of the German equipment intended for other purposes, but put to use in the trenches.

A shortage of heavy weapons handicapped the British. Only their 60-pounders (four guns to a division) were powerful enough to shell enemy gun emplacements from the Aisne's south shore, and these guns were inferior to German artillery in calibre, range and numbers. Four artillery battery of 6-inch (150 mm) guns (a total of sixteen), were rushed from England. Although a poor match against the German 8-inch (200 mm) howitzers, they helped somewhat. Defensive firepower was limited to rifles and two machine guns allotted to each battalion. The British regulars were excellent marksmen but even their combined accuracy was no match for the German machine guns and grenades.

British aircraft were used to report troop movements, although few were equipped with wireless. Aviators were able to recognise the advantage of observing artillery fire. On 24 September, Lieutenants B.T. James and D.S. Lewis detected three well-concealed enemy gun batteries that were inflicting considerable damage on British positions. They radioed back the location of the batteries, then droned in a wide circle, waiting to spot their own gunners' exploding shells. Anti-aircraft fire was desultory and inaccurate. The German Army used only percussion shells, which, according to Canadian sources, "not one in several hundred ever hit its aerial target, and fell to earth frequently at some point in the British lines and there burst."

== Race to the Sea ==
For a three-week period following the unexpected development of trench warfare, both sides gave up frontal assaults and began trying to envelop each other's northern flank. The period is called "Race to the Sea". As the Germans aimed for the Allied left flank, the Allies sought the German right wing.

The western front thus became a continuous trench system of more than 400 miles (640 km). From the Belgian channel town of Nieuwpoort, the trench lines ran southward for many miles, turning southeast at Noyon, continuing past Reims, Verdun, Saint-Mihiel and Nancy; then cutting south again to the northern Swiss border twenty miles (32 km) east of Belfort.

Meanwhile, the Belgian Army became a growing threat to German communications as the battle shifted northward. The Germans made plans on 28 September to capture the port of Antwerp and crush the Belgian forces. This important maritime city was encircled by an obsolete fortress system that could not withstand even 6-inch shells. An outer ring of eighteen forts ranged from seven to nine miles from the city, an inner ring from one to two miles. Each fort had two machine guns, but lacked telephone communications and means for observing gunfire. One 6-inch gun poked out at each mile; none of these forts had high explosive projectiles or smokeless gunpowder and several thousand surrounding acres had been cleared to provide unobstructed fields of fire.

At daybreak on 29 September, General Hans von Beseler, called out of retirement at the age of sixty-five, arrayed six divisions in an arc facing the outer ring of forts. The heavy siege howitzers that had destroyed the defences of Namur and Liège had been placed well beyond the range of Belgian artillery. Aided by aircraft spotting, German gunners quickly found their targets. Belgian guns belched dense, black smoke, revealing their exact location and the fields cleared by the defenders deprived the forts of any concealment. Two of the forts were quickly reduced to rubble; the others fell in methodical succession. Without waiting for the outcome, the Belgian government and 65,000 troops departed from Ostend that night, leaving an army of 80,000 to hold off the enemy. Next day the entire outer ring collapsed, prompting a mass evacuation of civilians to the neutral Netherlands. A British Royal Marine Division joined the defending troops during the attack, but even this combined force was unable to stem the German drive. After six days of stubborn fighting, the remaining garrison retired across the Scheldt River to the southern border of the Netherlands, while the rest of the Belgian army retreated to the West, to defend the last piece of Belgian territory in the Battle of the Yser (16–31 October 1914).

Many of those killed at the Aisne are buried at Vailly British Cemetery.

There were two later battles on the Aisne; the second (April–May 1917) and the third (May–June 1918).

== See also ==
- La Ferté-sous-Jouarre memorial
- Neil Douglas Findlay - the first British General to die in the war was killed in this battle.
- Ronald Simson, Scotland rugby player - the first rugby internationalist to die during the war, killed in this battle.
