= Canton of Anizy-le-Château =

Coordinates: 49°30′N 3°27′E

Anizy-le-Château
- Former canton
- Interactive map of Anizy-le-Château
- Country: France
- Region: Hauts-de-France
- Department: Aisne
- No. of communes: {{{nbcomm}}}
- Disbanded: 2015
- Area: 146.30 km^{2} (56.49 sq mi)
- Population (2012): 10,945
  - Density: 74.812/km^{2} (193.76/sq mi)

The canton of Anizy-le-Château is a former administrative division in northern France. It was disbanded following the French canton reorganisation which came into effect in March 2015. Its population was 10,945 in 2012. It included the following communes:

- Anizy-le-Château
- Bassoles-Aulers
- Bourguignon-sous-Montbavin
- Brancourt-en-Laonnois
- Cessières
- Chaillevois
- Chevregny
- Faucoucourt
- Laniscourt
- Laval-en-Laonnois
- Lizy
- Merlieux-et-Fouquerolles
- Monampteuil
- Mons-en-Laonnois
- Montbavin
- Pinon
- Prémontré
- Royaucourt-et-Chailvet
- Suzy
- Urcel
- Vaucelles-et-Beffecourt
- Vauxaillon
- Wissignicourt

== Demographics ==
Historical population Canton of Anizy-le-Château
| Year | 1962 | 1968 | 1975 | 1982 | 1990 | 1999 |
| Pop. | 9,091 | 10,108 | 10,376 | 10,354 | 10,330 | 10,089 |
| ±% | — | +11.2% | +2.7% | −0.2% | −0.2% | −2.3% |
From the year 1962 on: No double counting – residents of multiple communes (e.g. students and military personnel) are counted only once. Source: INSEE

== See also ==
- Cantons of the Aisne department
