= Canton of Laon-Nord =

Coordinates: 49°34′N 3°37′E

Laon-Nord
- Former canton
- Interactive map of Laon-Nord
- Country: France
- Region: Hauts-de-France
- Department: Aisne
- No. of communes: {{{nbcomm}}}
- Disbanded: 2015
- Population (2012): 16,554

The canton of Laon-Nord is a former administrative division in northern France. It was disbanded following the French canton reorganisation which came into effect in March 2015. It had 16,554 inhabitants (2012).

The canton comprised the following communes:

- Aulnois-sous-Laon
- Besny-et-Loizy
- Bucy-lès-Cerny
- Cerny-lès-Bucy
- Chambry
- Crépy
- Laon (partly)
- Molinchart
- Vivaise

== Demographics ==
Historical population
Year	Pop.	±%
1990	15,374	—
1999	15,866	+3.2%
2012	16,554	+4.3%

== See also ==
- Cantons of the Aisne department
