= Arrondissement of Laon =

Coordinates: 49°34′N 3°37′E

Laon
- Arrondissement
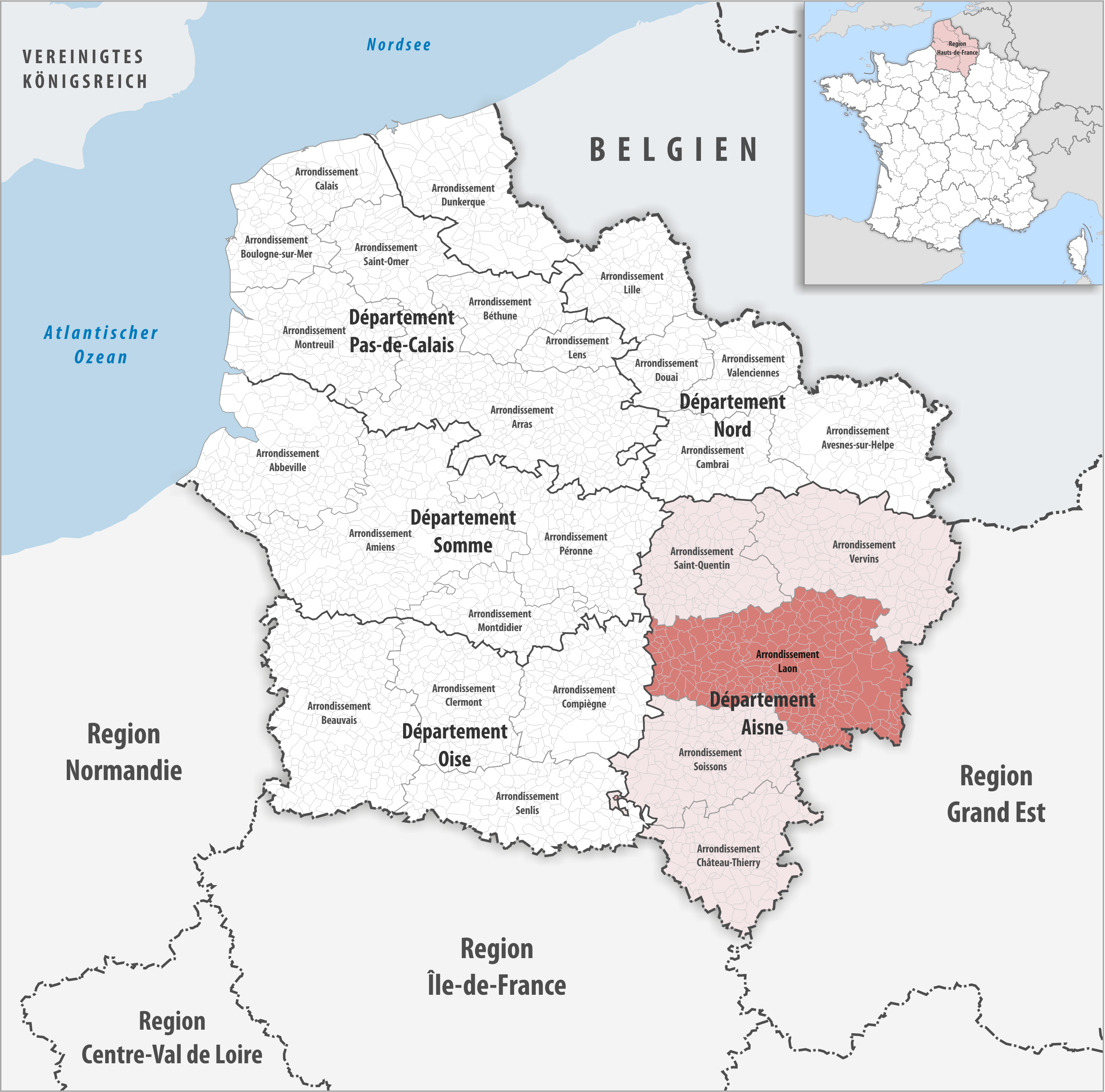
- Location within the region Hauts-de-France
- Country: France
- Region: Hauts-de-France
- Department: Aisne
- No. of communes: {{{nbcomm}}}
- Area: 2,175.3 km^{2} (839.9 sq mi)
- Population (2023): 153,092
  - Density: 70.377/km^{2} (182.28/sq mi)
- INSEE code: 022

The arrondissement of Laon is an arrondissement of France in the Aisne department in the Hauts-de-France region. It has 240 communes. Its population is 154,021 (2021), and its area is 2,175.3 km^{2} (839.9 sq mi).

== Composition ==
The communes of the arrondissement of Laon, and their INSEE codes, are:

1. Abbécourt (02001)
2. Achery (02002)
3. Agnicourt-et-Séchelles (02004)
4. Aguilcourt (02005)
5. Aizelles (02007)
6. Amifontaine (02013)
7. Amigny-Rouy (02014)
8. Andelain (02016)
9. Anguilcourt-le-Sart (02017)
10. Anizy-le-Grand (02018)
11. Arrancy (02024)
12. Assis-sur-Serre (02027)
13. Athies-sous-Laon (02028)
14. Aubigny-en-Laonnois (02033)
15. Aulnois-sous-Laon (02037)
16. Autremencourt (02039)
17. Autreville (02041)
18. Barenton-Bugny (02046)
19. Barenton-Cel (02047)
20. Barenton-sur-Serre (02048)
21. Barisis-aux-Bois (02049)
22. Bassoles-Aulers (02052)
23. Beaumont-en-Beine (02056)
24. Beaurieux (02058)
25. Beautor (02059)
26. Berrieux (02072)
27. Berry-au-Bac (02073)
28. Bertaucourt-Epourdon (02074)
29. Bertricourt (02076)
30. Besmé (02078)
31. Besny-et-Loizy (02080)
32. Béthancourt-en-Vaux (02081)
33. Bièvres (02088)
34. Bichancourt (02086)
35. Blérancourt (02093)
36. Bois-lès-Pargny (02096)
37. Boncourt (02097)
38. Bosmont-sur-Serre (02101)
39. Bouconville-Vauclair (02102)
40. Bouffignereux (02104)
41. Bourg-et-Comin (02106)
42. Bourguignon-sous-Coucy (02107)
43. Bourguignon-sous-Montbavin (02108)
44. Brancourt-en-Laonnois (02111)
45. Braye-en-Laonnois (02115)
46. Brie (02122)
47. Bruyères-et-Montbérault (02128)
48. Bucy-lès-Cerny (02132)
49. Bucy-lès-Pierrepont (02133)
50. Caillouël-Crépigny (02139)
51. Camelin (02140)
52. Caumont (02145)
53. Cerny-en-Laonnois (02150)
54. Cerny-lès-Bucy (02151)
55. Cessières-Suzy (02153)
56. Chaillevois (02155)
57. Chalandry (02156)
58. Chambry (02157)
59. Chamouille (02158)
60. Champs (02159)
61. Charmes (02165)
62. Châtillon-lès-Sons (02169)
63. Chaudardes (02171)
64. Chauny (02173)
65. Chérêt (02177)
66. Chermizy-Ailles (02178)
67. Chéry-lès-Pouilly (02180)
68. Chevregny (02183)
69. Chivres-en-Laonnois (02189)
70. Chivy-lès-Étouvelles (02191)
71. Cilly (02194)
72. Clacy-et-Thierret (02196)
73. Colligis-Crandelain (02205)
74. Commenchon (02207)
75. Concevreux (02208)
76. Condé-sur-Suippe (02211)
77. Condren (02212)
78. Corbeny (02215)
79. Coucy-lès-Eppes (02218)
80. Coucy-la-Ville (02219)
81. Coucy-le-Château-Auffrique (02217)
82. Courbes (02222)
83. Courtrizy-et-Fussigny (02229)
84. Couvron-et-Aumencourt (02231)
85. Crécy-au-Mont (02236)
86. Crécy-sur-Serre (02237)
87. Crépy (02238)
88. Craonne (02234)
89. Craonnelle (02235)
90. Cuirieux (02248)
91. Cuiry-lès-Chaudardes (02250)
92. Cuissy-et-Geny (02252)
93. Danizy (02260)
94. Dercy (02261)
95. Deuillet (02262)
96. Ébouleau (02274)
97. Eppes (02282)
98. Erlon (02283)
99. Étouvelles (02294)
100. Évergnicourt (02299)
101. La Fère (02304)
102. Festieux (02309)
103. Folembray (02318)
104. Fourdrain (02329)
105. Fresnes-sous-Coucy (02333)
106. Fressancourt (02335)
107. Frières-Faillouël (02336)
108. Froidmont-Cohartille (02338)
109. Gizy (02346)
110. Goudelancourt-lès-Berrieux (02349)
111. Goudelancourt-lès-Pierrepont (02350)
112. Grandlup-et-Fay (02353)
113. Guivry (02362)
114. Guny (02363)
115. Guyencourt (02364)
116. Jumencourt (02395)
117. Jumigny (02396)
118. Juvincourt-et-Damary (02399)
119. Landricourt (02406)
120. Laniscourt (02407)
121. Laon (02408)
122. Lappion (02409)
123. Laval-en-Laonnois (02413)
124. Leuilly-sous-Coucy (02423)
125. Lierval (02429)
126. Liesse-Notre-Dame (02430)
127. Liez (02431)
128. Lor (02440)
129. Mâchecourt (02448)
130. Maizy (02453)
131. La Malmaison (02454)
132. Manicamp (02456)
133. Marchais (02457)
134. Marcy-sous-Marle (02460)
135. Marest-Dampcourt (02461)
136. Marle (02468)
137. Martigny-Courpierre (02471)
138. Mauregny-en-Haye (02472)
139. Mayot (02473)
140. Mennessis (02474)
141. Merlieux-et-Fouquerolles (02478)
142. Mesbrecourt-Richecourt (02480)
143. Meurival (02482)
144. Missy-lès-Pierrepont (02486)
145. Molinchart (02489)
146. Monceau-lès-Leups (02492)
147. Monceau-le-Waast (02493)
148. Mons-en-Laonnois (02497)
149. Montaigu (02498)
150. Montbavin (02499)
151. Montchâlons (02501)
152. Monthenault (02508)
153. Montigny-le-Franc (02513)
154. Montigny-sous-Marle (02516)
155. Montigny-sur-Crécy (02517)
156. Mortiers (02529)
157. Moulins (02530)
158. Moussy-Verneuil (02531)
159. Muscourt (02534)
160. Neufchâtel-sur-Aisne (02541)
161. Neuflieux (02542)
162. La Neuville-Bosmont (02545)
163. La Neuville-en-Beine (02546)
164. Neuville-sur-Ailette (02550)
165. Nizy-le-Comte (02553)
166. Nouvion-et-Catillon (02559)
167. Nouvion-le-Comte (02560)
168. Nouvion-le-Vineux (02561)
169. Œuilly (02565)
170. Ognes (02566)
171. Orainville (02572)
172. Orgeval (02573)
173. Oulches-la-Vallée-Foulon (02578)
174. Paissy (02582)
175. Pancy-Courtecon (02583)
176. Parfondru (02587)
177. Pargnan (02588)
178. Pargny-les-Bois (02591)
179. Pierremande (02599)
180. Pierrepont (02600)
181. Pignicourt (02601)
182. Pinon (02602)
183. Ployart-et-Vaurseine (02609)
184. Pont-Saint-Mard (02616)
185. Pontavert (02613)
186. Pouilly-sur-Serre (02617)
187. Prémontré (02619)
188. Presles-et-Thierny (02621)
189. Prouvais (02626)
190. Proviseux-et-Plesnoy (02627)
191. Quierzy (02631)
192. Quincy-Basse (02632)
193. Remies (02638)
194. Rogécourt (02651)
195. Roucy (02656)
196. Royaucourt-et-Chailvet (02661)
197. Saint-Aubin (02671)
198. Sainte-Croix (02675)
199. Sainte-Preuve (02690)
200. Saint-Erme-Outre-et-Ramecourt (02676)
201. Saint-Gobain (02680)
202. Saint-Nicolas-aux-Bois (02685)
203. Saint-Paul-aux-Bois (02686)
204. Saint-Pierremont (02689)
205. Saint-Thomas (02696)
206. Samoussy (02697)
207. Selens (02704)
208. La Selve (02705)
209. Septvaux (02707)
210. Servais (02716)
211. Sinceny (02719)
212. Sissonne (02720)
213. Sons-et-Ronchères (02727)
214. Tavaux-et-Pontséricourt (02737)
215. Tergnier (02738)
216. Thiernu (02742)
217. Toulis-et-Attencourt (02745)
218. Travecy (02746)
219. Trosly-Loire (02750)
220. Trucy (02751)
221. Ugny-le-Gay (02754)
222. Urcel (02755)
223. Variscourt (02761)
224. Vassogne (02764)
225. Vaucelles-et-Beffecourt (02765)
226. Vauxaillon (02768)
227. Vendresse-Beaulne (02778)
228. Verneuil-sous-Coucy (02786)
229. Verneuil-sur-Serre (02787)
230. Versigny (02788)
231. Vesles-et-Caumont (02790)
232. Veslud (02791)
233. La Ville-aux-Bois-lès-Pontavert (02803)
234. Villeneuve-sur-Aisne (02360)
235. Villequier-Aumont (02807)
236. Viry-Noureuil (02820)
237. Vivaise (02821)
238. Vorges (02824)
239. Voyenne (02827)
240. Wissignicourt (02834)

== History ==
The arrondissement of Laon was created in 1800. At the January 2017 reorganization of the arrondissements of Aisne, it lost 30 communes to the arrondissement of Vervins and three to the arrondissement of Soissons.

As a result of the reorganisation of the cantons of France which came into effect in 2015, the borders of the cantons are no longer related to the borders of the arrondissements. The cantons of the arrondissement of Laon were, as of January 2015:

1. Anizy-le-Château
2. Chauny
3. Coucy-le-Château-Auffrique
4. Craonne
5. Crécy-sur-Serre
6. La Fère
7. Laon-Nord
8. Laon-Sud
9. Marle
10. Neufchâtel-sur-Aisne
11. Rozoy-sur-Serre
12. Sissonne
13. Tergnier
