= 02151 =

02151 may refer to:

- Revere, Massachusetts, a city in Massachusetts, US
- Krefeld, a district of North Rhine-Westphalia, Germany
- Cerny-lès-Bucy, a commune in the Aisne département, France
