= Aulnois-sous-Laon =

- Commune
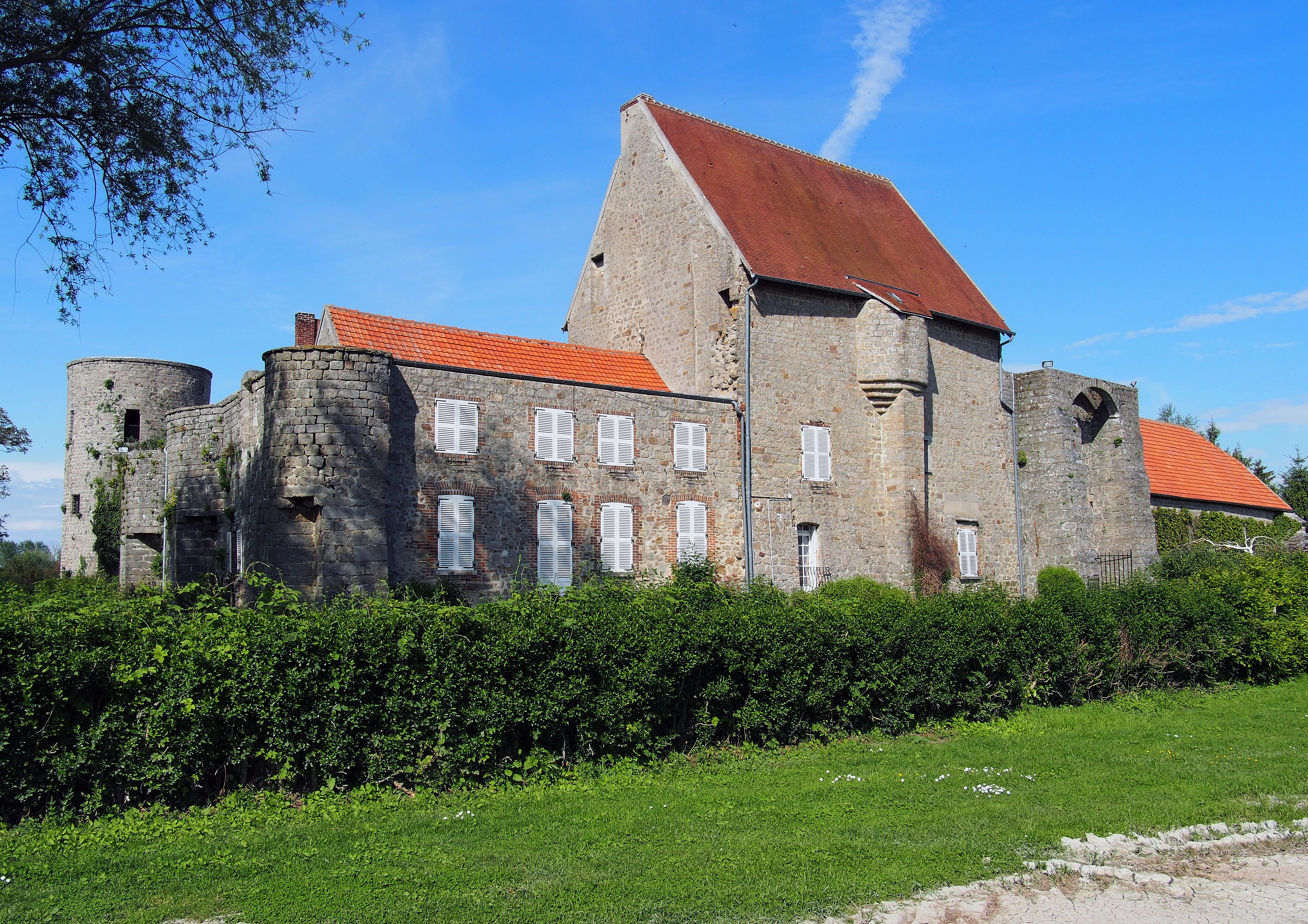
- Chateau

- Coat of arms
- Location of Aulnois-sous-Laon
- Location within France Location within Hauts-de-France
- Coordinates: 49°36′47″N 3°36′29″E
- Country: France
- Region: Hauts-de-France
- Department: Aisne
- Arrondissement: Laon
- Canton: Laon-1
- Intercommunality: CA Pays de Laon

Government
  - Mayor (2026–32): Denis Dumay
- Area^{1}: 10.01 km^{2} (3.86 sq mi)
- Highest elevation: 115 m (377 ft)
- Lowest elevation: 66 m (217 ft)
- Population (2023): 1,348
  - Density: 134.7/km^{2} (348.8/sq mi)
- Time zone: UTC+01:00 (CET)
  - Summer (DST): UTC+02:00 (CEST)
- INSEE/Postal code: 02037 /02000
- ^{1} French Land Register data, which excludes lakes, ponds, glaciers > 1 km^{2} (0.386 sq mi or 247 acres) and river estuaries.

Aulnois-sous-Laon (French pronunciation: [o(l)nwa su lɑ̃], literally Aulnois under Laon) is a commune in the department of Aisne in the Hauts-de-France region of northern France.

== Geography ==
Aulnois-sous-Laon is located some 30 km southeast of Saint-Quentin and 5 km due north of Laon. The A26 autoroute passes through the northeastern part of the commune but has no exit in the commune. The D967 road also passes through the commune from Crécy-sur-Serre in the north continuing to Laon in the south. The village can be accessed by the D541 branching west from the D967 passing through the village and continuing west to Vivaise. The D545 road also come from the south through the village and continues northeast to Barenton-Bugny. The commune is predominantly farmland with a little forest.

The Ru d'Alnois rises south of the village and flows northeast changing to the Ruisseau de Longuedeau and forming the northeastern border of the commune before continuing northeast joining the Ru des Barentons which eventually joins the Souche river at Barenton-sur-Serre.

=== Heraldry ===
Arms of Aulnois-sous-Laon	The official status of the blazon remains to be determined Blazon: Or, with escutcheon gules charged with three martlets in sable supporting a castle of four towers argent port and windows sable all supported by two Alder branches fructed in vert and posed in inverted chevron, all accompanied by three martlets sable at dexter chief, sinister chief, and base.

== Administration ==
List of Successive Mayors of Aulnois-sous-Laon

From	To	Name	Party
2001	Present	Denis Dumay	PS

== Population ==
Historical population
Year	Pop.	±% p.a.
1968	913	—
1975	900	−0.20%
1982	1,090	+2.77%
1990	1,146	+0.63%
1999	1,218	+0.68%
2007	1,308	+0.90%
2012	1,367	+0.89%
2017	1,422	+0.79%
2023	1,348	−0.89%
Source: INSEE

== Sights ==
Two sites in the commune are registered as historical monuments:

- The remains of an old Feudal Castle (13th century)
- The Park around the Castle

== See also ==
- Communes of the Aisne department
