= Bourguignon-sous-Montbavin =

- Commune
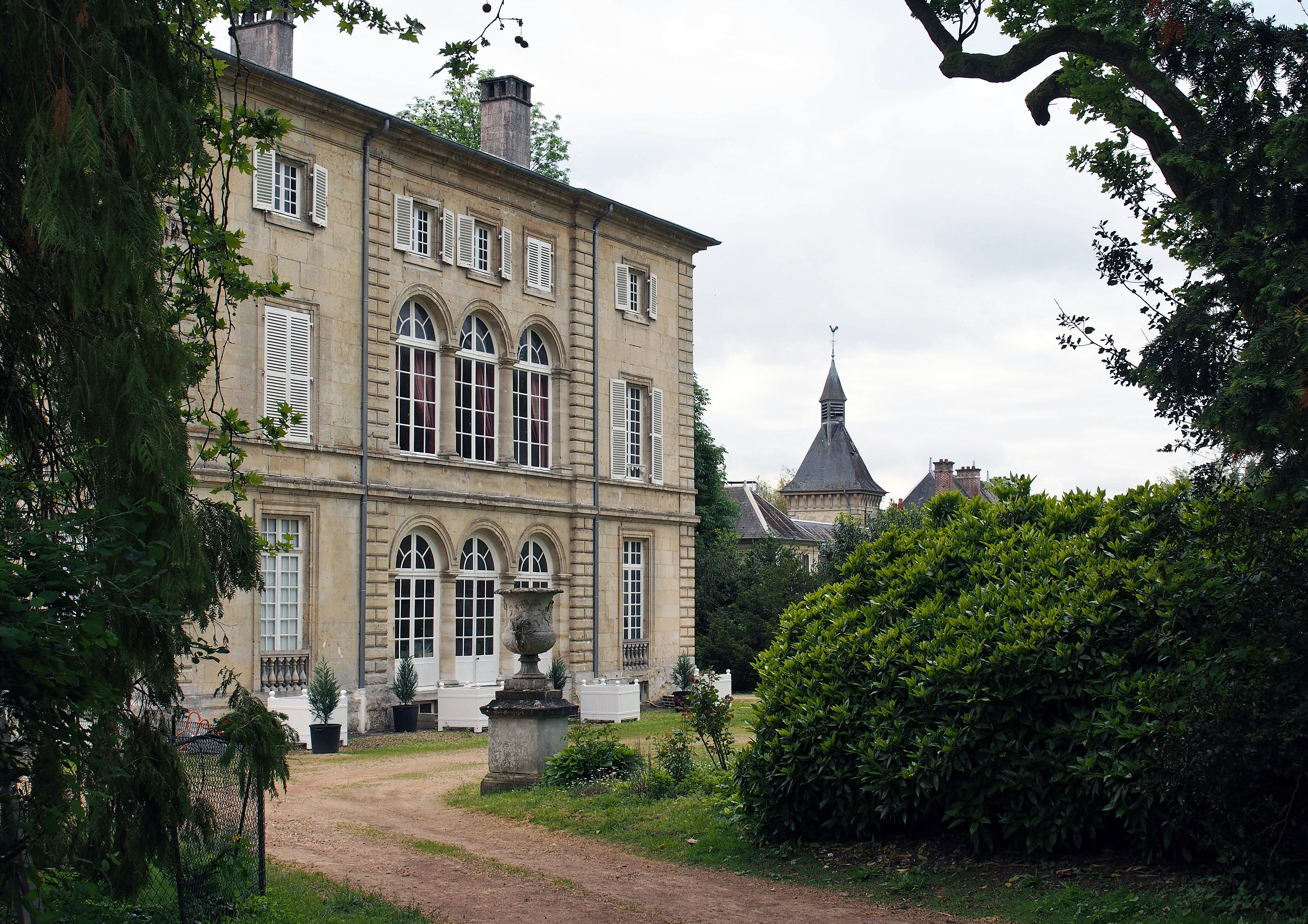
- Chateau

- Coat of arms
- Location of Bourguignon-sous-Montbavin
- Location within France Location within Hauts-de-France
- Coordinates: 49°31′44″N 3°32′32″E
- Country: France
- Region: Hauts-de-France
- Department: Aisne
- Arrondissement: Laon
- Canton: Laon-1

Government
  - Mayor (2026–32): Eric Bonamour du Tartre
- Area^{1}: 1.92 km^{2} (0.74 sq mi)
- Elevation: 193 m (633 ft)
- Highest elevation: 182 m (597 ft)
- Lowest elevation: 70 m (230 ft)
- Population (2023): 140
  - Density: 73/km^{2} (190/sq mi)
- Time zone: UTC+01:00 (CET)
  - Summer (DST): UTC+02:00 (CEST)
- INSEE/Postal code: 02108 /02000
- ^{1} French Land Register data, which excludes lakes, ponds, glaciers > 1 km^{2} (0.386 sq mi or 247 acres) and river estuaries.

Bourguignon-sous-Montbavin (French pronunciation: [buʁɡiɲɔ̃ su mɔ̃bavɛ̃], literally Bourguignon under Montbavin) is a commune in the department of Aisne in Hauts-de-France in northern France.

== Population ==
Historical population
Year	Pop.	±% p.a.
1968	108	—
1975	110	+0.26%
1982	141	+3.61%
1990	147	+0.52%
1999	121	−2.14%
2007	129	+0.80%
2012	147	+2.65%
2017	158	+1.45%
2023	140	−2.00%
Source: INSEE

== See also ==
- Communes of the Aisne department
