= Clacy-et-Thierret =

- Commune
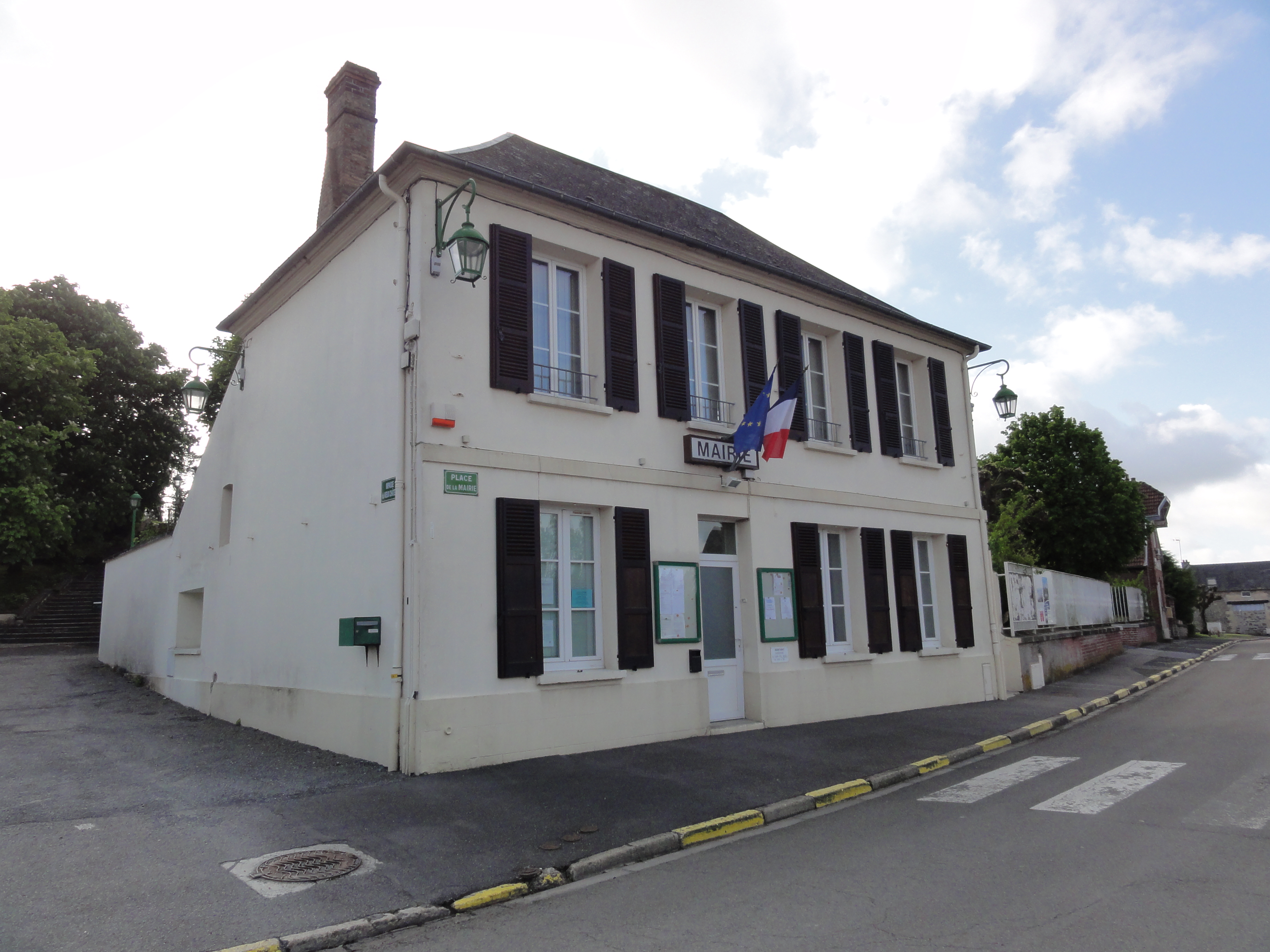
- The town hall of Clacy-et-Thierret

- Coat of arms
- Location of Clacy-et-Thierret
- Location within France Location within Hauts-de-France
- Coordinates: 49°32′42″N 3°34′16″E
- Country: France
- Region: Hauts-de-France
- Department: Aisne
- Arrondissement: Laon
- Canton: Laon-1
- Intercommunality: CA Pays de Laon

Government
  - Mayor (2026–32): Philippe Nicolle
- Area^{1}: 4.21 km^{2} (1.63 sq mi)
- Elevation: 68 m (223 ft)
- Highest elevation: 82 m (269 ft)
- Lowest elevation: 63 m (207 ft)
- Population (2023): 289
  - Density: 68.6/km^{2} (178/sq mi)
- Time zone: UTC+01:00 (CET)
  - Summer (DST): UTC+02:00 (CEST)
- INSEE/Postal code: 02196 /02000
- ^{1} French Land Register data, which excludes lakes, ponds, glaciers > 1 km^{2} (0.386 sq mi or 247 acres) and river estuaries.

Clacy-et-Thierret (French pronunciation: [klasi e tjɛʁɛ]) is a commune in the Aisne department, Hauts-de-France, northern France.

== Population ==
Historical population
Year	Pop.	±% p.a.
1968	360	—
1975	372	+0.47%
1982	342	−1.19%
1990	359	+0.61%
1999	304	−1.83%
2007	354	+1.92%
2012	336	−1.04%
2017	314	−1.35%
2023	289	−1.37%
Source: INSEE

== See also ==
- Communes of the Aisne department
