= Canton of Laon-1 =

Coordinates: 49.58°N 3.63°E

- Canton
- Situation of the canton of Laon-1 in the department of Aisne
- Country: France
- Region: Hauts-de-France
- Department: Aisne
- No. of communes: {{{nbcomm}}}
- Population (2023): 24,623
- INSEE code: 0209

The canton of Laon-1 is an administrative division of the Aisne department, in northern France. It was created at the French canton reorganisation which came into effect in March 2015. Its seat is in Laon.

It consists of the following communes:

1. Anizy-le-Grand
2. Aulnois-sous-Laon
3. Bassoles-Aulers
4. Besny-et-Loizy
5. Bourguignon-sous-Montbavin
6. Brancourt-en-Laonnois
7. Bucy-lès-Cerny
8. Cerny-lès-Bucy
9. Cessières-Suzy
10. Chaillevois
11. Chambry
12. Clacy-et-Thierret
13. Crépy
14. Laniscourt
15. Laon (partly)
16. Merlieux-et-Fouquerolles
17. Molinchart
18. Mons-en-Laonnois
19. Montbavin
20. Pinon
21. Prémontré
22. Royaucourt-et-Chailvet
23. Urcel
24. Vaucelles-et-Beffecourt
25. Vauxaillon
26. Vivaise
27. Wissignicourt
