= Chéry-lès-Pouilly =

- Commune
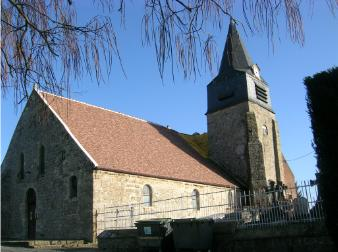
- The church of Chéry-lès-Pouilly

- Coat of arms
- Location of Chéry-lès-Pouilly
- Location within France Location within Hauts-de-France
- Coordinates: 49°39′30″N 3°36′22″E
- Country: France
- Region: Hauts-de-France
- Department: Aisne
- Arrondissement: Laon
- Canton: Marle
- Intercommunality: Pays de la Serre

Government
  - Mayor (2026–32): Laurence Rytter
- Area^{1}: 17.22 km^{2} (6.65 sq mi)
- Elevation: 76 m (249 ft)
- Highest elevation: 116 m (381 ft)
- Lowest elevation: 59 m (194 ft)
- Population (2023): 742
  - Density: 43.1/km^{2} (112/sq mi)
- Time zone: UTC+01:00 (CET)
  - Summer (DST): UTC+02:00 (CEST)
- INSEE/Postal code: 02180 /02000
- ^{1} French Land Register data, which excludes lakes, ponds, glaciers > 1 km^{2} (0.386 sq mi or 247 acres) and river estuaries.

Chéry-lès-Pouilly is a commune in the Aisne department in Hauts-de-France in northern France.

== Population ==
Historical population
| Year | Pop. | ±% p.a. |
|---|---|---|
| 1968 | 633 | — |
| 1975 | 605 | −0.64% |
| 1982 | 702 | +2.15% |
| 1990 | 702 | +0.00% |
| 1999 | 645 | −0.94% |
| 2007 | 660 | +0.29% |
| 2012 | 683 | +0.69% |
| 2017 | 710 | +0.78% |
| 2023 | 742 | +0.74% |
Source: INSEE

== See also ==
- Communes of the Aisne department
