= Vauxaillon =

- Commune
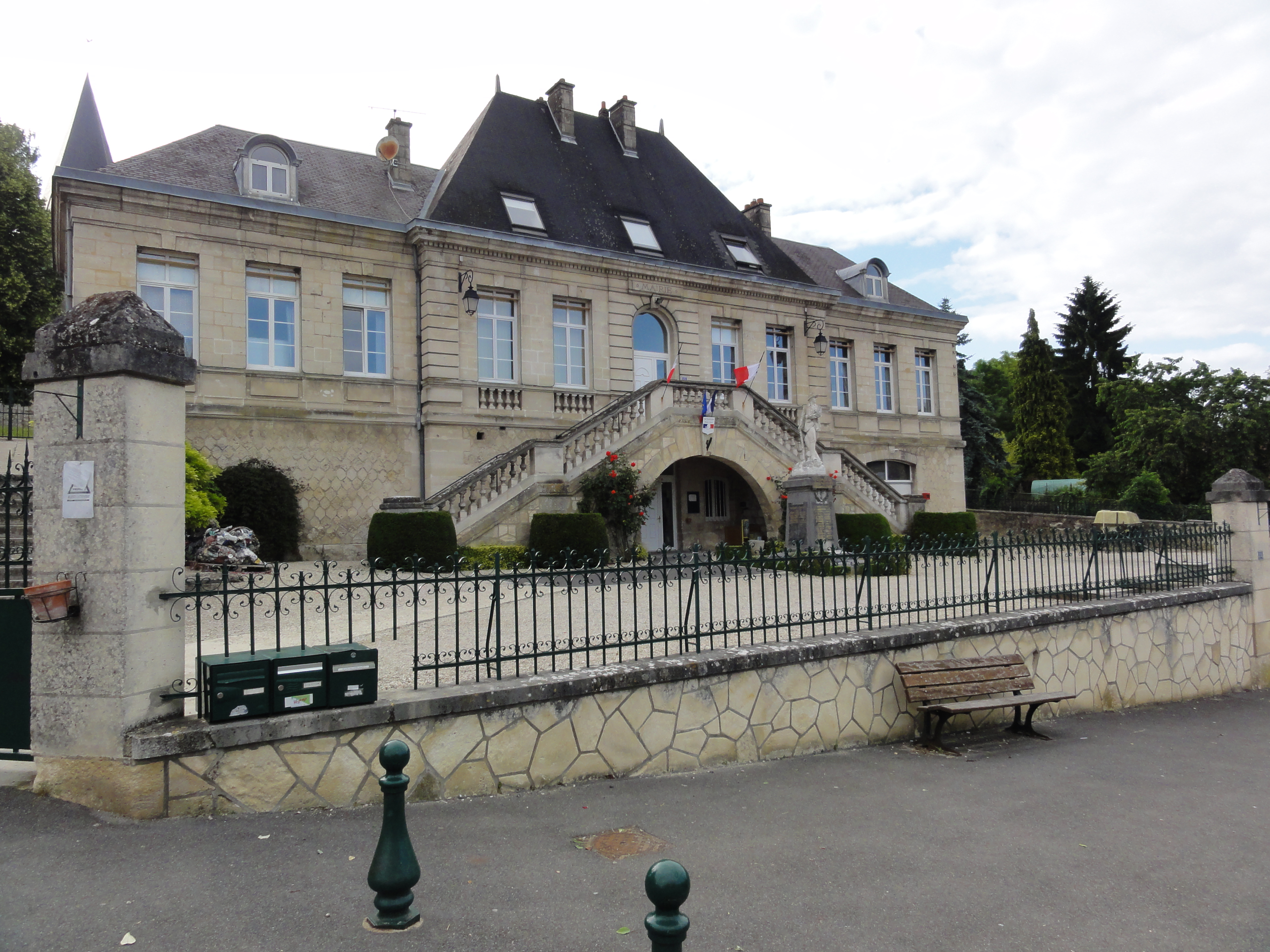
- The town hall of Vauxaillon

- Coat of arms
- Location of Vauxaillon
- Location within France Location within Hauts-de-France
- Coordinates: 49°28′47″N 3°24′33″E
- Country: France
- Region: Hauts-de-France
- Department: Aisne
- Arrondissement: Laon
- Canton: Laon-1

Government
  - Mayor (2026–32): David Pertin
- Area^{1}: 13.77 km^{2} (5.32 sq mi)
- Elevation: 55 m (180 ft)
- Highest elevation: 161 m (528 ft)
- Lowest elevation: 52 m (171 ft)
- Population (2023): 498
  - Density: 36.2/km^{2} (93.7/sq mi)
- Time zone: UTC+01:00 (CET)
  - Summer (DST): UTC+02:00 (CEST)
- INSEE/Postal code: 02768 /02320
- ^{1} French Land Register data, which excludes lakes, ponds, glaciers > 1 km^{2} (0.386 sq mi or 247 acres) and river estuaries.

Vauxaillon (French pronunciation: [voksajɔ̃]) is a commune in the Aisne department in Hauts-de-France in northern France.

== Geography ==
The river Ailette forms all of the commune's northern border.

== Population ==
Historical population
Year	Pop.	±% p.a.
1968	300	—
1975	288	−0.58%
1982	290	+0.10%
1990	326	+1.47%
1999	378	+1.66%
2007	447	+2.12%
2012	504	+2.43%
2017	540	+1.39%
2023	498	−1.34%
Source: INSEE

== See also ==
- Communes of the Aisne department
