= Royaucourt-et-Chailvet =

- Commune
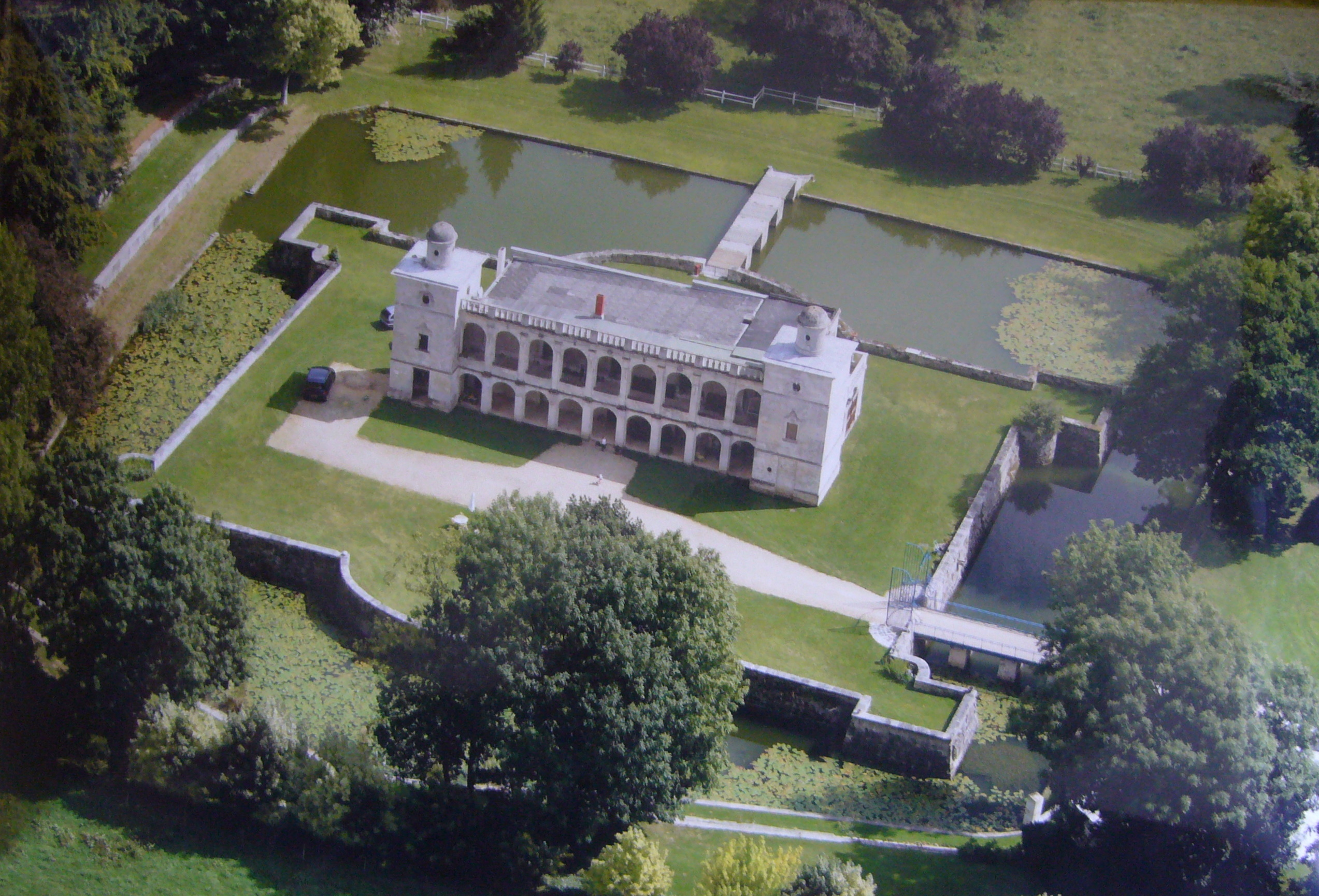
- Chateau of Chailvet
- Location of Royaucourt-et-Chailvet
- Location within France Location within Hauts-de-France
- Coordinates: 49°30′43″N 3°32′05″E
- Country: France
- Region: Hauts-de-France
- Department: Aisne
- Arrondissement: Laon
- Canton: Laon-1
- Intercommunality: Picardie des Châteaux

Government
  - Mayor (2026–32): Guillaume Le Rudulier
- Area^{1}: 3.04 km^{2} (1.17 sq mi)
- Elevation: 70 m (230 ft)
- Highest elevation: 162 m (531 ft)
- Lowest elevation: 57 m (187 ft)
- Population (2023): 226
  - Density: 74.3/km^{2} (193/sq mi)
- Time zone: UTC+01:00 (CET)
  - Summer (DST): UTC+02:00 (CEST)
- INSEE/Postal code: 02661 /02000
- ^{1} French Land Register data, which excludes lakes, ponds, glaciers > 1 km^{2} (0.386 sq mi or 247 acres) and river estuaries.

Royaucourt-et-Chailvet (French pronunciation: [ʁwajokuʁ e ʃɛlvɛ]) is a commune in the Aisne department in Hauts-de-France in northern France.

== Geography ==
The river Ailette forms small part of the commune's southern border.

== Population ==
Historical population
Year	Pop.	±% p.a.
1968	157	—
1975	155	−0.18%
1982	163	+0.72%
1990	201	+2.65%
1999	177	−1.40%
2007	189	+0.82%
2012	209	+2.03%
2017	252	+3.81%
2023	226	−1.80%
Source: INSEE

== See also ==
- Communes of the Aisne department
