= Mons-en-Laonnois =

- Commune
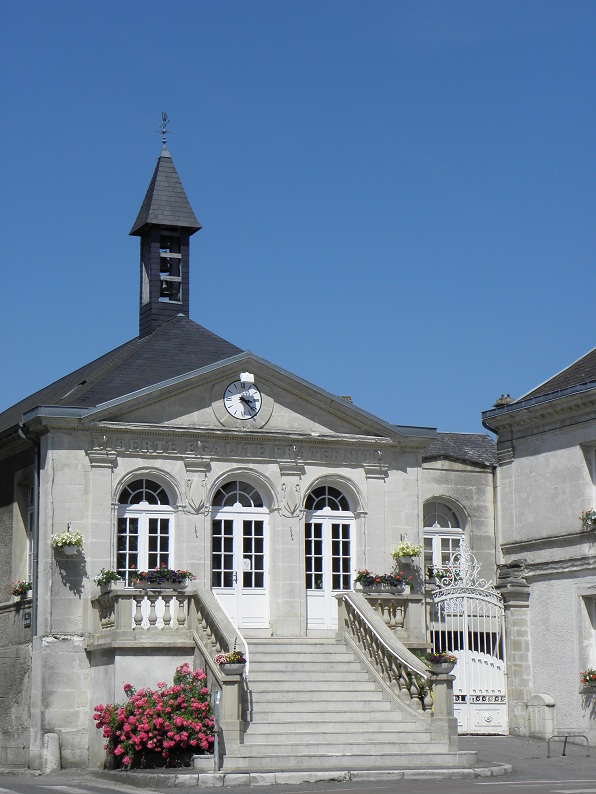
- Town hall

- Coat of arms
- Location of Mons-en-Laonnois
- Location within France Location within Hauts-de-France
- Coordinates: 49°32′17″N 3°33′15″E
- Country: France
- Region: Hauts-de-France
- Department: Aisne
- Arrondissement: Laon
- Canton: Laon-1
- Intercommunality: CA Pays de Laon

Government
  - Mayor (2026–32): Gérard Charles
- Area^{1}: 4.1 km^{2} (1.6 sq mi)
- Elevation: 160 m (520 ft)
- Highest elevation: 187 m (614 ft)
- Lowest elevation: 62 m (203 ft)
- Population (2023): 1,146
  - Density: 280/km^{2} (720/sq mi)
- Time zone: UTC+01:00 (CET)
  - Summer (DST): UTC+02:00 (CEST)
- INSEE/Postal code: 02497 /02000
- ^{1} French Land Register data, which excludes lakes, ponds, glaciers > 1 km^{2} (0.386 sq mi or 247 acres) and river estuaries.

Mons-en-Laonnois is a commune in the Aisne department in Hauts-de-France in northern France.

== Population ==
Historical population
Year	Pop.	±% p.a.
1968	987	—
1975	996	+0.13%
1982	973	−0.33%
1990	999	+0.33%
1999	947	−0.59%
2007	1,081	+1.67%
2012	1,202	+2.14%
2017	1,152	−0.85%
2023	1,146	−0.09%
Source: INSEE

== See also ==
- Communes of the Aisne department
