= Chambry, Aisne =

Chambry
- Commune
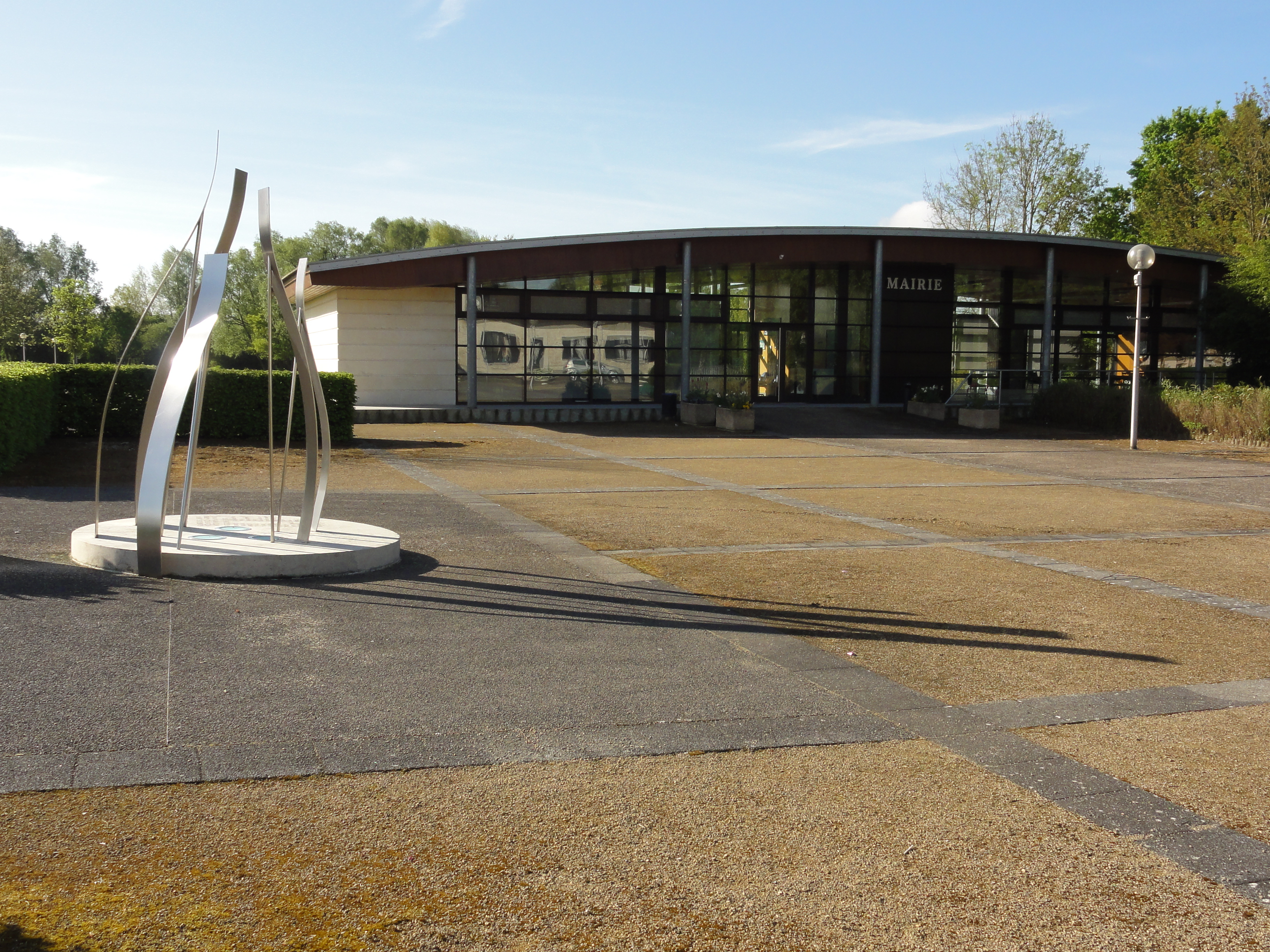
- The town hall of Chambry

- Coat of arms
- Location of Chambry
- Location within France Location within Hauts-de-France
- Coordinates: 49°35′32″N 3°39′22″E
- Country: France
- Region: Hauts-de-France
- Department: Aisne
- Arrondissement: Laon
- Canton: Laon-1
- Intercommunality: CA Pays de Laon

Government
  - Mayor (2026–32): Sylviane Lefebvre
- Area^{1}: 8.89 km^{2} (3.43 sq mi)
- Elevation: 80 m (260 ft)
- Highest elevation: 96 m (315 ft)
- Lowest elevation: 67 m (220 ft)
- Population (2023): 827
  - Density: 93.0/km^{2} (241/sq mi)
- Time zone: UTC+01:00 (CET)
  - Summer (DST): UTC+02:00 (CEST)
- INSEE/Postal code: 02157 /02000
- ^{1} French Land Register data, which excludes lakes, ponds, glaciers > 1 km^{2} (0.386 sq mi or 247 acres) and river estuaries.

Chambry (French pronunciation: [ʃɑ̃bʁi]) is a commune in the Aisne department in Hauts-de-France in northern France.

== Population ==
Historical population
Year	Pop.	±% p.a.
1968	406	—
1975	534	+3.99%
1982	749	+4.95%
1990	709	−0.68%
1999	785	+1.14%
2007	767	−0.29%
2012	741	−0.69%
2017	848	+2.73%
2023	827	−0.42%
Source: INSEE

== See also ==
- Communes of the Aisne department
