= Laniscourt =

- Commune
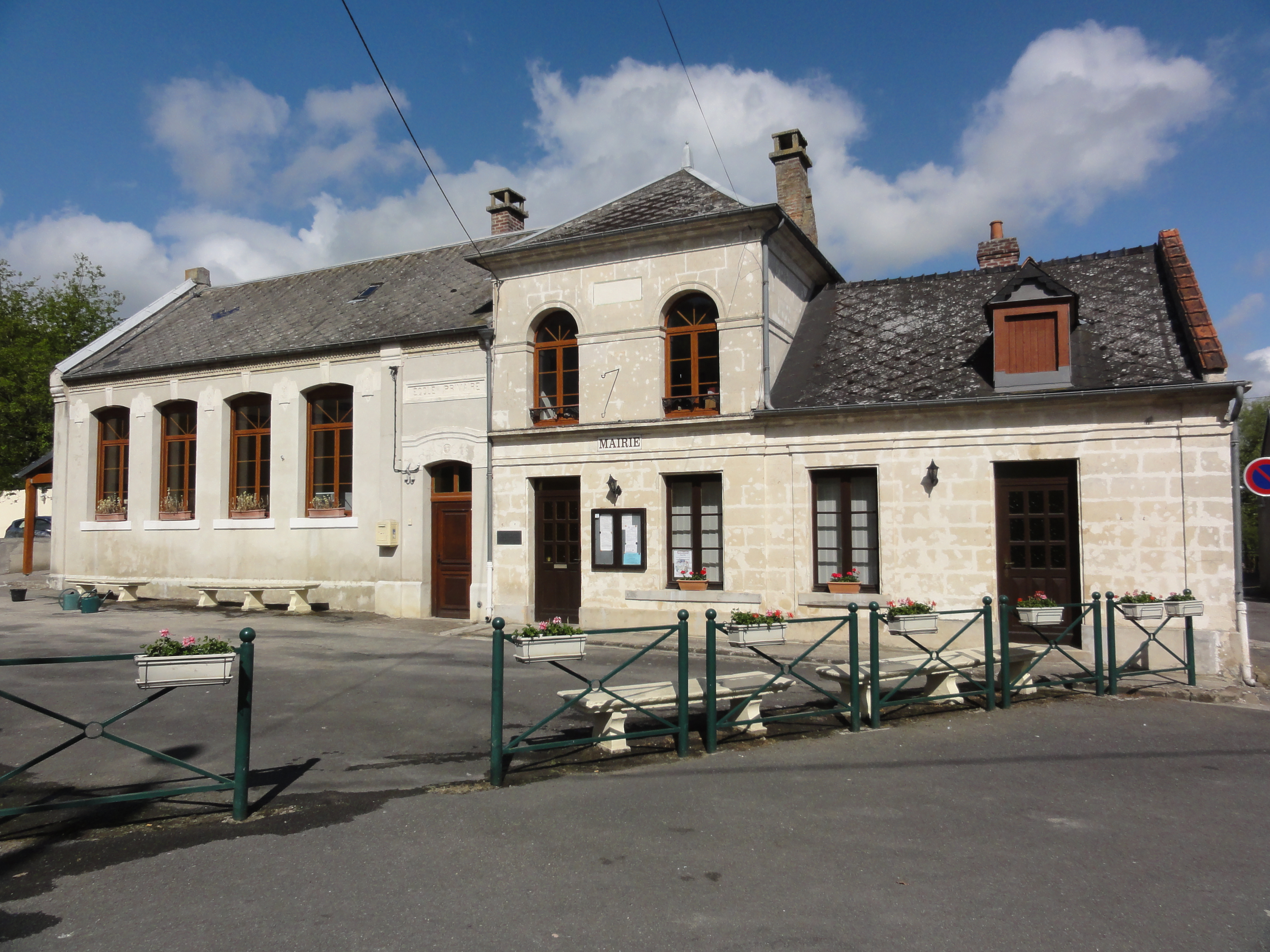
- The town hall and school of Laniscourt
- Location of Laniscourt
- Location within France Location within Hauts-de-France
- Coordinates: 49°32′58″N 3°32′38″E
- Country: France
- Region: Hauts-de-France
- Department: Aisne
- Arrondissement: Laon
- Canton: Laon-1
- Intercommunality: CA Pays de Laon

Government
  - Mayor (2026–32): Jean-Marc Wack
- Area^{1}: 3 km^{2} (1.2 sq mi)
- Elevation: 80 m (260 ft)
- Highest elevation: 181 m (594 ft)
- Lowest elevation: 68 m (223 ft)
- Population (2023): 216
  - Density: 72/km^{2} (190/sq mi)
- Time zone: UTC+01:00 (CET)
  - Summer (DST): UTC+02:00 (CEST)
- INSEE/Postal code: 02407 /02000
- ^{1} French Land Register data, which excludes lakes, ponds, glaciers > 1 km^{2} (0.386 sq mi or 247 acres) and river estuaries.

Laniscourt is a commune in the Aisne department in Hauts-de-France in northern France.

== Population ==
Historical population
Year	Pop.	±% p.a.
1968	117	—
1975	112	−0.62%
1982	135	+2.70%
1990	172	+3.07%
1999	185	+0.81%
2007	183	−0.14%
2012	169	−1.58%
2017	182	+1.49%
2023	216	+2.90%
Source: INSEE

== See also ==
- Communes of the Aisne department
