= Crépy, Aisne =

Crépy
- Commune
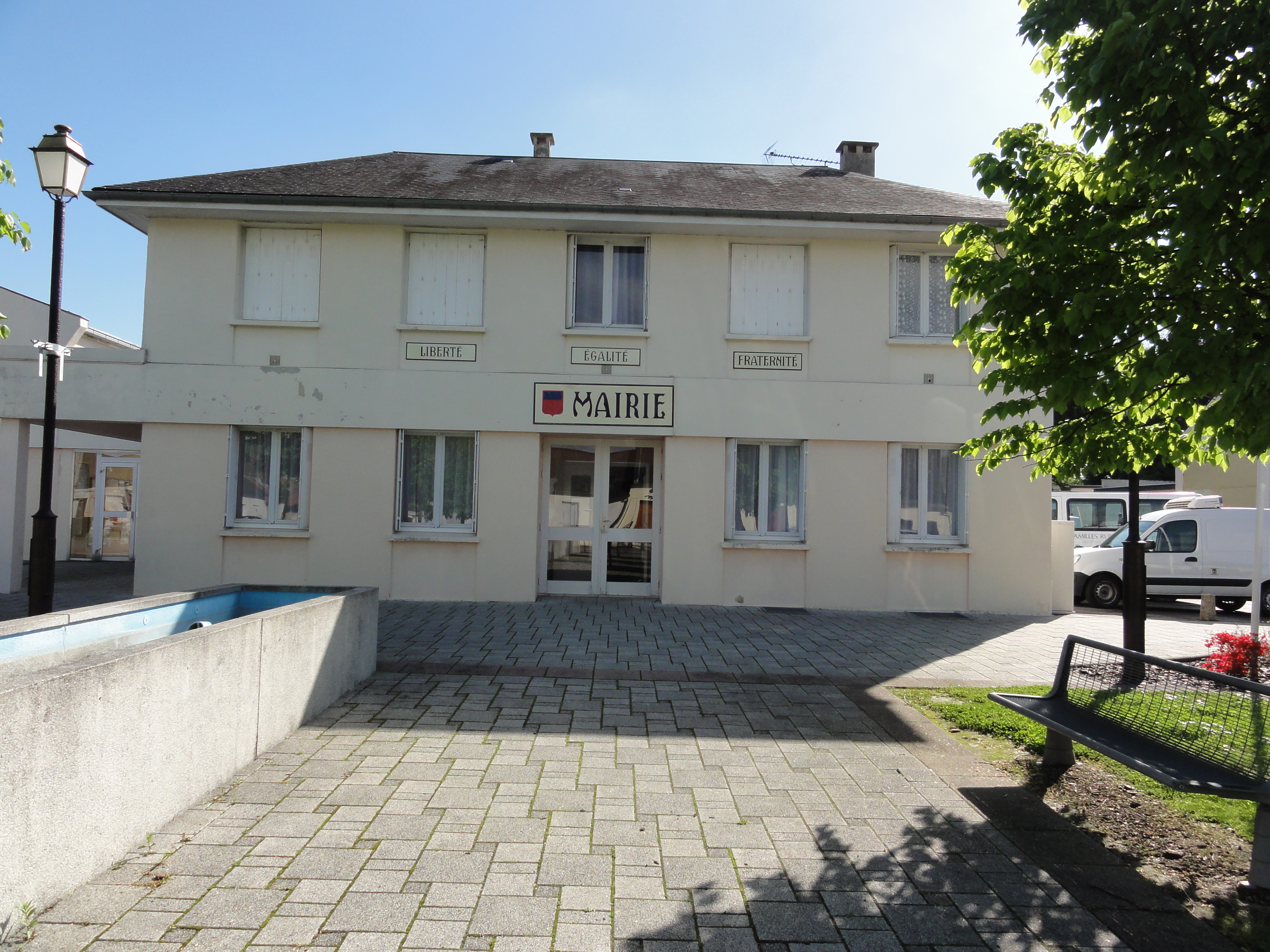
- The town hall of Crépy

- Coat of arms
- Location of Crépy
- Location within France Location within Hauts-de-France
- Coordinates: 49°36′18″N 3°30′53″E
- Country: France
- Region: Hauts-de-France
- Department: Aisne
- Arrondissement: Laon
- Canton: Laon-1
- Intercommunality: CA Pays de Laon

Government
  - Mayor (2026–32): Patricia Mezzarobba
- Area^{1}: 27.7 km^{2} (10.7 sq mi)
- Elevation: 79 m (259 ft)
- Highest elevation: 183 m (600 ft)
- Lowest elevation: 63 m (207 ft)
- Population (2023): 1,812
  - Density: 65.4/km^{2} (169/sq mi)
- Time zone: UTC+01:00 (CET)
  - Summer (DST): UTC+02:00 (CEST)
- INSEE/Postal code: 02238 /02870
- ^{1} French Land Register data, which excludes lakes, ponds, glaciers > 1 km^{2} (0.386 sq mi or 247 acres) and river estuaries.

Crépy (French pronunciation: [kʁepi]), formerly known as Crépy-en-Laonnais (French pronunciation: [kʁepi ɑ̃ lanwa]), is a commune in the Aisne department in Hauts-de-France in northern France.

== History ==
The treaty of Crépy, during the Italian War of 1542–1546 was signed there between Francis I of France and Holy Roman Emperor Charles V on 18 September 1544. (Note: At the time of the treaty Crépy was spelt Crespy so the treaty is also known as the Treaty of Crespy ("Crespy, Treaty of." The Columbia Encyclopedia, 6th ed.. 2013. Encyclopedia.com. (July 22, 2014). Cited in encyclopedia.com)

During World War I, from March through August 1918, Crépy was the location of the infamous Paris Gun.

== Population ==
Historical population
Year	Pop.	±% p.a.
1968	1,534	—
1975	1,441	−0.89%
1982	1,543	+0.98%
1990	1,574	+0.25%
1999	1,710	+0.93%
2007	1,832	+0.87%
2012	1,946	+1.21%
2017	1,837	−1.15%
2023	1,812	−0.23%
Source: INSEE

== Geography ==
=== Climate ===
This area is characterized by equable climates with few extremes of temperature and ample precipitation in all months. It is located poleward of the Mediterranean climate region on the western sides of the continents, between 35° and 60° N and S latitude. The Köppen Climate Classification subtype for this climate is "Cfb". (Marine West Coast Climate).

Climate data for Crépy, Aisne
Month	Jan	Feb	Mar	Apr	May	Jun	Jul	Aug	Sep	Oct	Nov	Dec	Year
Mean daily maximum °C (°F)	4 (39)	6 (42)	10 (50)	14 (57)	18 (64)	21 (69)	22 (71)	21 (69)	19 (66)	14 (57)	8 (46)	6 (42)	13 (55)
Mean daily minimum °C (°F)	0 (32)	0 (32)	1 (33)	4 (39)	7 (44)	10 (50)	12 (53)	11 (51)	9 (48)	6 (42)	3 (37)	1 (33)	5 (41)
Average precipitation mm (inches)	46 (1.8)	46 (1.8)	43 (1.7)	41 (1.6)	46 (1.8)	53 (2.1)	58 (2.3)	51 (2)	51 (2)	48 (1.9)	51 (2)	58 (2.3)	570 (22.6)
Source: Weatherbase

== See also ==
- Communes of the Aisne department
