= Bucy-lès-Cerny =

- Commune
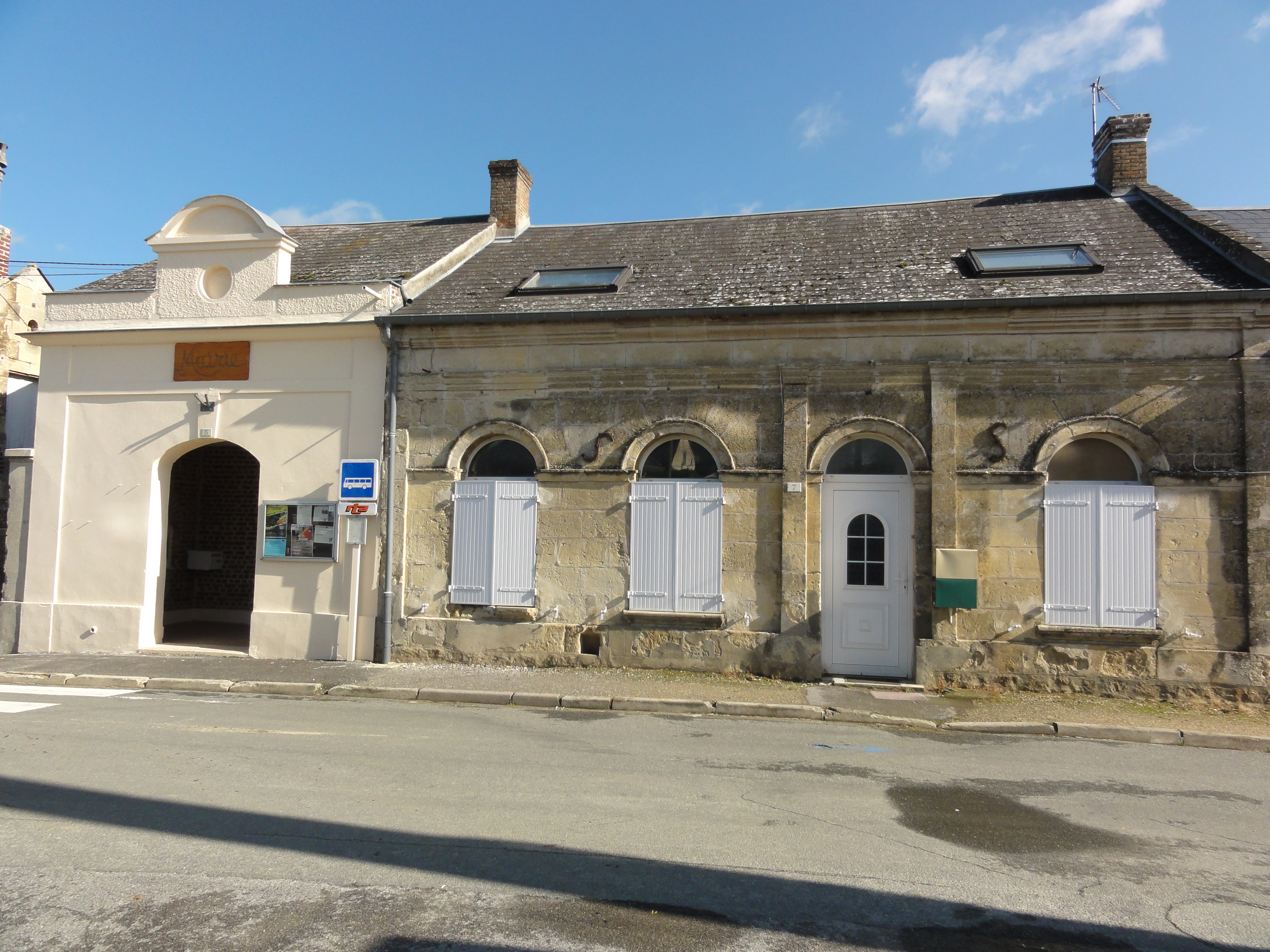
- The town hall of Bucy-lès-Cerny

- Coat of arms
- Location of Bucy-lès-Cerny
- Location within France Location within Hauts-de-France
- Coordinates: 49°34′59″N 3°31′05″E
- Country: France
- Region: Hauts-de-France
- Department: Aisne
- Arrondissement: Laon
- Canton: Laon-1
- Intercommunality: CA Pays de Laon

Government
  - Mayor (2026–32): Philippe Van Hamme
- Area^{1}: 8.74 km^{2} (3.37 sq mi)
- Elevation: 133 m (436 ft)
- Highest elevation: 196 m (643 ft)
- Lowest elevation: 87 m (285 ft)
- Population (2023): 188
  - Density: 21.5/km^{2} (55.7/sq mi)
- Time zone: UTC+01:00 (CET)
  - Summer (DST): UTC+02:00 (CEST)
- INSEE/Postal code: 02132 /02870
- ^{1} French Land Register data, which excludes lakes, ponds, glaciers > 1 km^{2} (0.386 sq mi or 247 acres) and river estuaries.

Bucy-lès-Cerny is a commune in the department of Aisne in Hauts-de-France in northern France.

== Population ==
Historical population
Year	Pop.	±% p.a.
1968	192	—
1975	175	−1.32%
1982	159	−1.36%
1990	188	+2.12%
1999	170	−1.11%
2007	180	+0.72%
2012	200	+2.13%
2017	203	+0.30%
2023	188	−1.27%
Source: INSEE

== See also ==
- Communes of the Aisne department
