= Brancourt-en-Laonnois =

- Commune
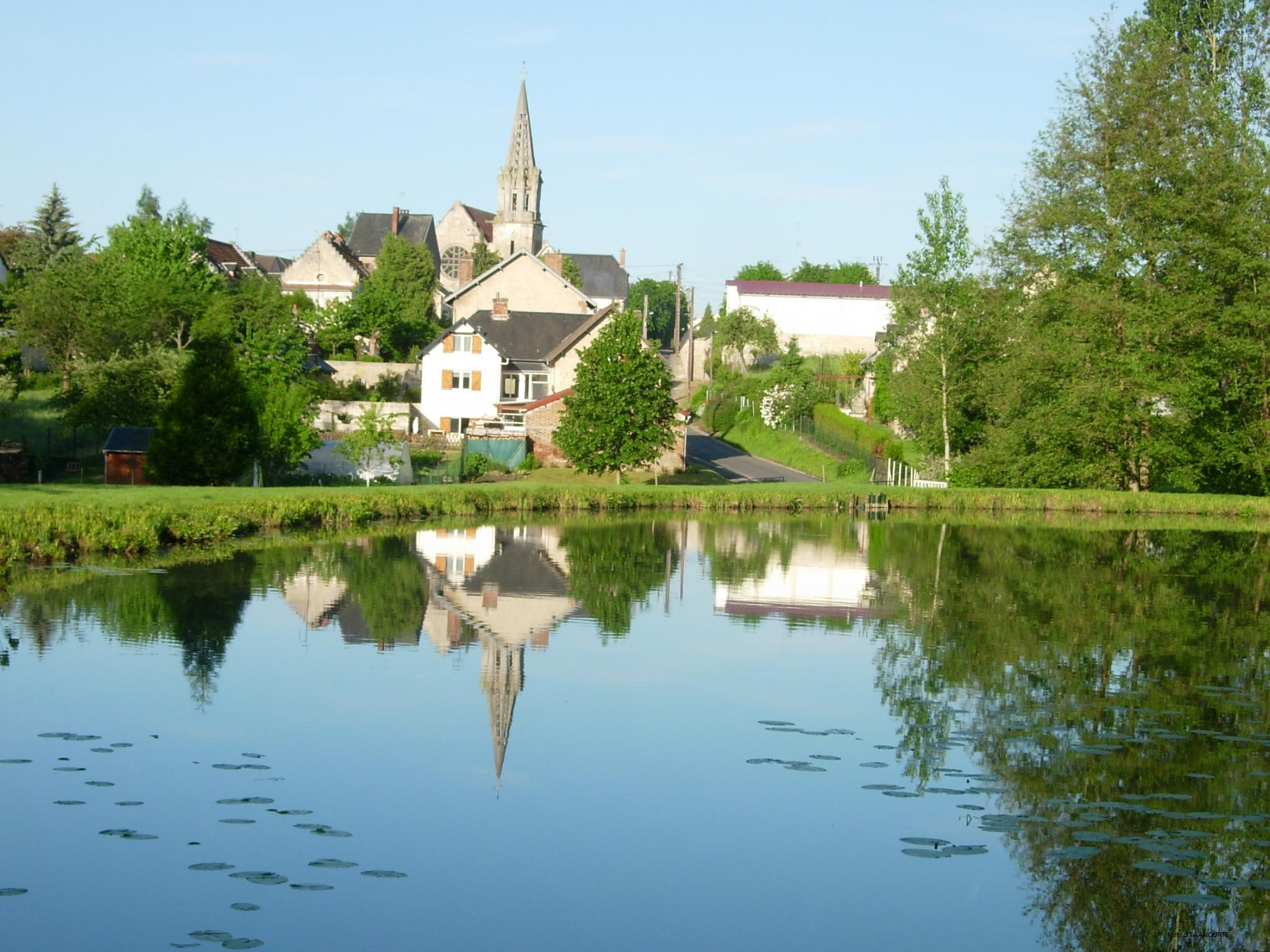
- The lake and surroundings at Brancourt-en-Laonnois

- Coat of arms
- Location of Brancourt-en-Laonnois
- Location within France Location within Hauts-de-France
- Coordinates: 49°30′55″N 3°25′10″E
- Country: France
- Region: Hauts-de-France
- Department: Aisne
- Arrondissement: Laon
- Canton: Laon-1

Government
  - Mayor (2026–32): Marie-Laure Rouyer Thiebaut
- Area^{1}: 6.56 km^{2} (2.53 sq mi)
- Elevation: 80 m (260 ft)
- Highest elevation: 179 m (587 ft)
- Lowest elevation: 63 m (207 ft)
- Population (2023): 702
  - Density: 107/km^{2} (277/sq mi)
- Time zone: UTC+01:00 (CET)
  - Summer (DST): UTC+02:00 (CEST)
- INSEE/Postal code: 02111 /02320
- ^{1} French Land Register data, which excludes lakes, ponds, glaciers > 1 km^{2} (0.386 sq mi or 247 acres) and river estuaries.

Brancourt-en-Laonnois is a commune in the department of Aisne in Hauts-de-France in northern France.

== Population ==
Historical population
Year	Pop.	±% p.a.
1968	374	—
1975	415	+1.50%
1982	536	+3.72%
1990	710	+3.58%
1999	675	−0.56%
2007	640	−0.66%
2012	706	+1.98%
2017	708	+0.06%
2023	702	−0.14%
Source: INSEE

== See also ==
- Communes of the Aisne department
