= Chevregny =

- Commune
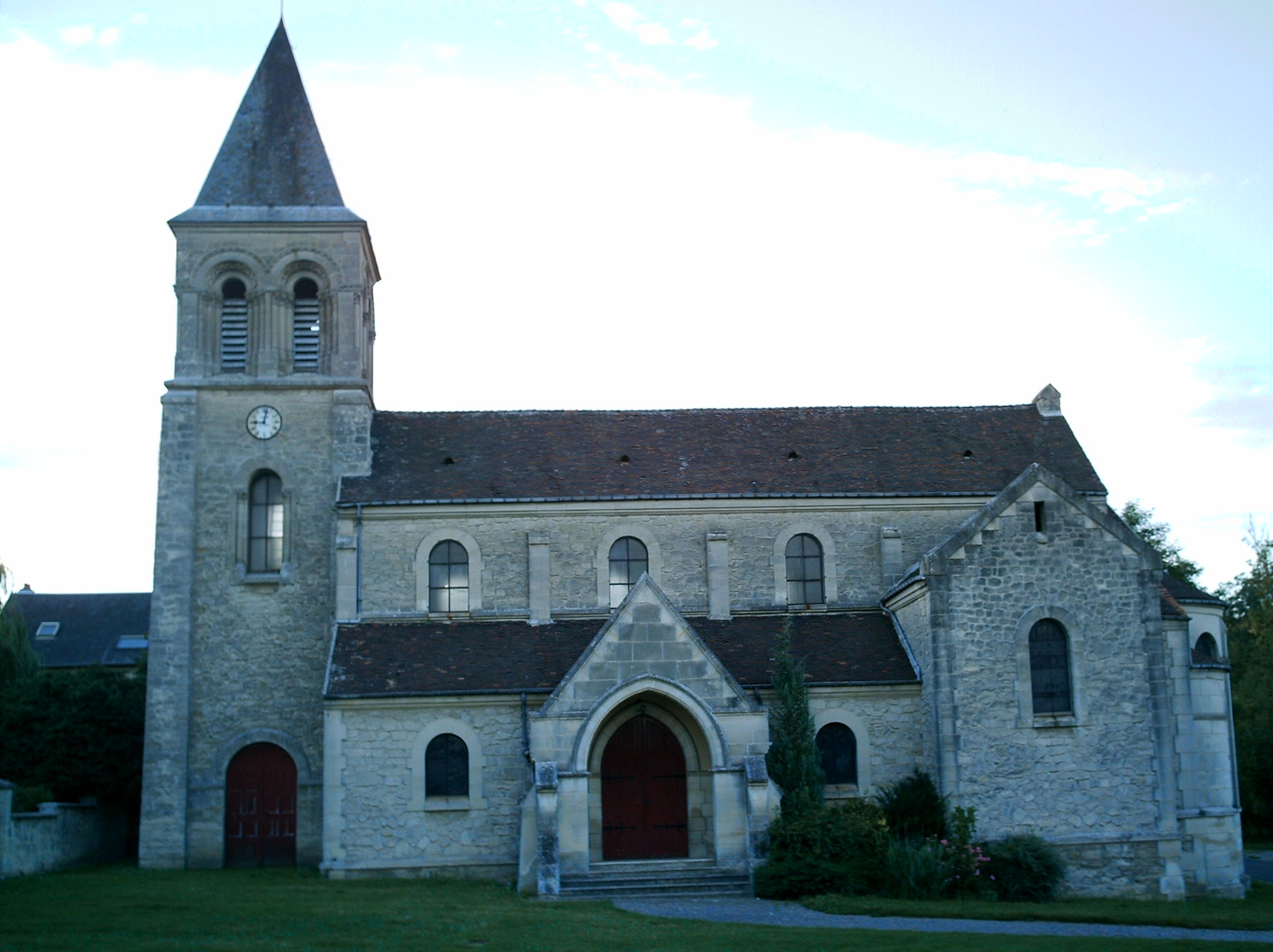
- The church of Chevregny
- Location of Chevregny
- Location within France Location within Hauts-de-France
- Coordinates: 49°28′24″N 3°35′32″E
- Country: France
- Region: Hauts-de-France
- Department: Aisne
- Arrondissement: Laon
- Canton: Villeneuve-sur-Aisne
- Intercommunality: Chemin des Dames

Government
  - Mayor (2026–32): Élisabeth Deligny
- Area^{1}: 8.85 km^{2} (3.42 sq mi)
- Elevation: 100 m (330 ft)
- Highest elevation: 188 m (617 ft)
- Lowest elevation: 66 m (217 ft)
- Population (2023): 197
  - Density: 22.3/km^{2} (57.7/sq mi)
- Time zone: UTC+01:00 (CET)
  - Summer (DST): UTC+02:00 (CEST)
- INSEE/Postal code: 02183 /02000
- ^{1} French Land Register data, which excludes lakes, ponds, glaciers > 1 km^{2} (0.386 sq mi or 247 acres) and river estuaries.

Chevregny (French pronunciation: [ʃəvʁəɲi]) is a commune in the Aisne department in Hauts-de-France in northern France.

== Geography ==
The river Ailette flows westward through the commune.

== Population ==
Historical population
Year	Pop.	±% p.a.
1968	176	—
1975	164	−1.00%
1982	147	−1.55%
1990	178	+2.42%
1999	196	+1.08%
2007	195	−0.06%
2012	195	+0.00%
2017	187	−0.83%
2023	197	+0.87%
Source: INSEE

== See also ==
- Communes of the Aisne department
