= Besny-et-Loizy =

- Commune
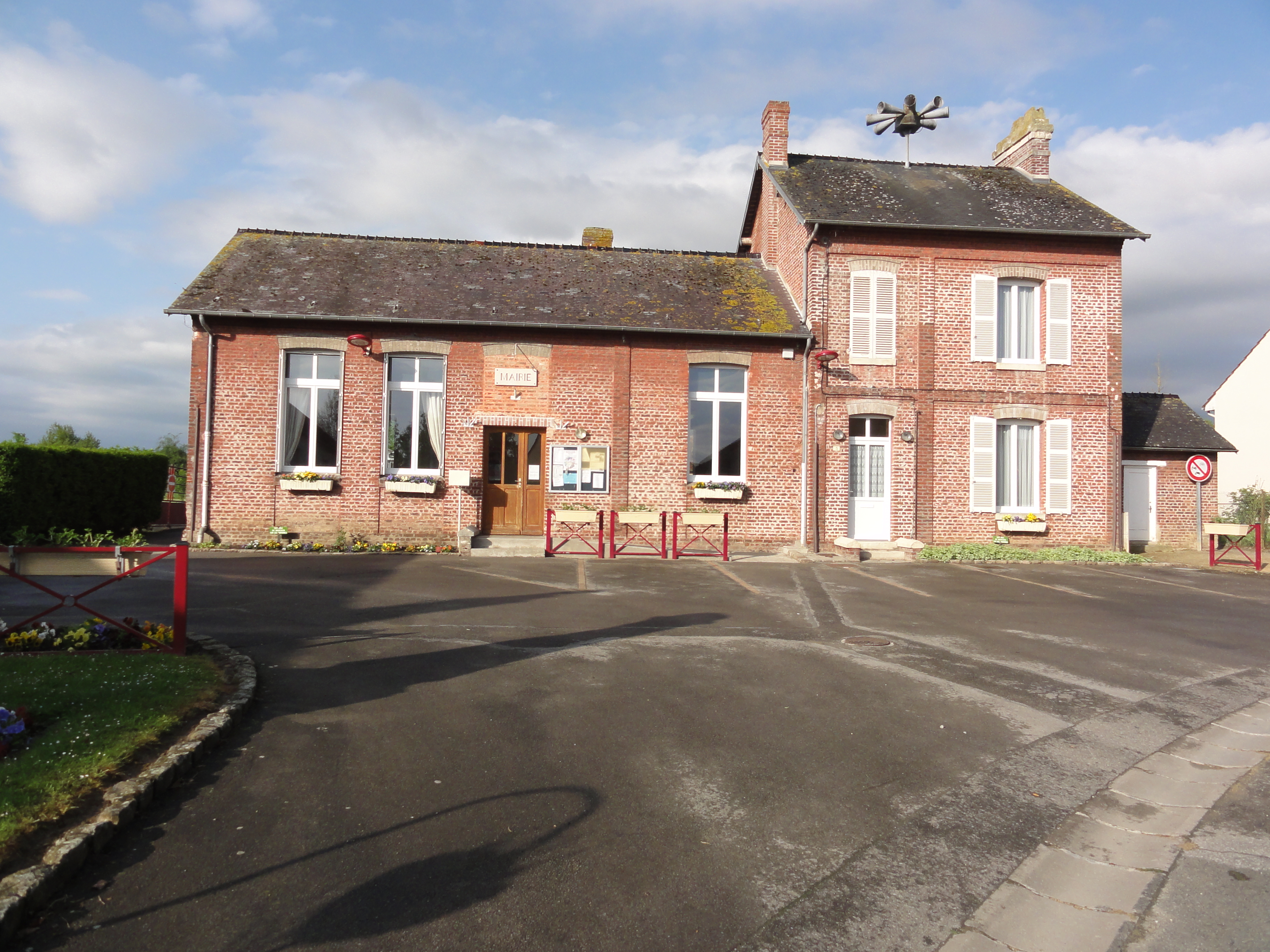
- Town hall
- Location of Besny-et-Loizy
- Location within France Location within Hauts-de-France
- Coordinates: 49°36′02″N 3°34′57″E
- Country: France
- Region: Hauts-de-France
- Department: Aisne
- Arrondissement: Laon
- Canton: Laon-1
- Intercommunality: CA Pays de Laon

Government
  - Mayor (2026–32): Franck Démazure
- Area^{1}: 9.76 km^{2} (3.77 sq mi)
- Elevation: 80 m (260 ft)
- Highest elevation: 118 m (387 ft)
- Lowest elevation: 72 m (236 ft)
- Population (2023): 309
  - Density: 31.7/km^{2} (82.0/sq mi)
- Time zone: UTC+01:00 (CET)
  - Summer (DST): UTC+02:00 (CEST)
- INSEE/Postal code: 02080 /02870
- ^{1} French Land Register data, which excludes lakes, ponds, glaciers > 1 km^{2} (0.386 sq mi or 247 acres) and river estuaries.

Besny-et-Loizy (French pronunciation: [bɛni e lwazi]) is a commune in the department of Aisne in Hauts-de-France in northern France.

== Population ==
Historical population
Year	Pop.	±% p.a.
1968	233	—
1975	259	+1.52%
1982	308	+2.51%
1990	314	+0.24%
1999	350	+1.21%
2007	357	+0.25%
2012	367	+0.55%
2017	350	−0.94%
2023	309	−2.06%
Source: INSEE

== See also ==
- Communes of the Aisne department
