= Urcel =

- Commune
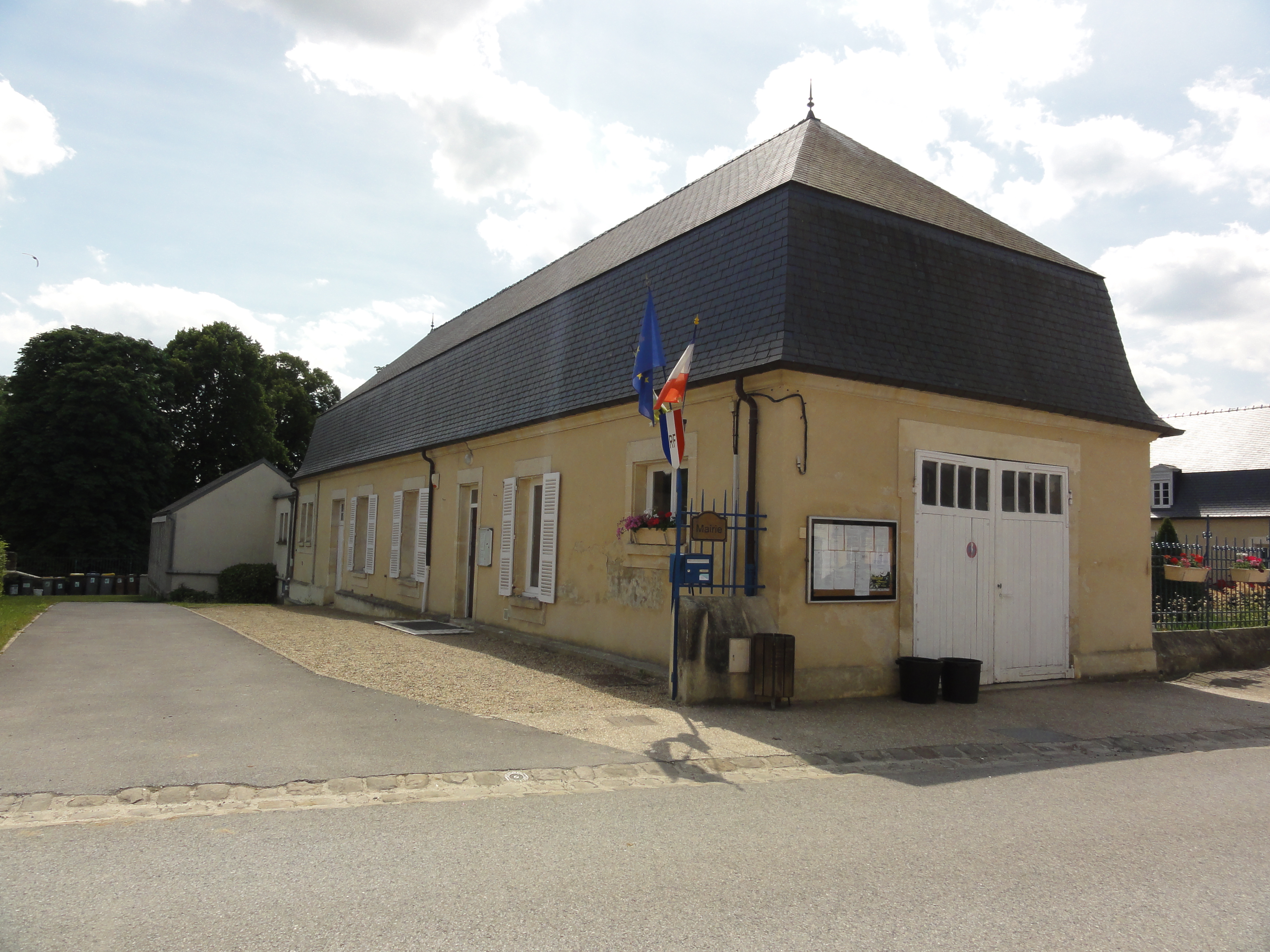
- The town hall of Urcel

- Coat of arms
- Location of Urcel
- Location within France Location within Hauts-de-France
- Coordinates: 49°29′31″N 3°33′32″E
- Country: France
- Region: Hauts-de-France
- Department: Aisne
- Arrondissement: Laon
- Canton: Laon-1
- Intercommunality: Picardie des Châteaux

Government
  - Mayor (2026–32): Vincent Pierson
- Area^{1}: 7.2 km^{2} (2.8 sq mi)
- Elevation: 78 m (256 ft)
- Highest elevation: 171 m (561 ft)
- Lowest elevation: 58 m (190 ft)
- Population (2023): 534
  - Density: 74/km^{2} (190/sq mi)
- Time zone: UTC+01:00 (CET)
  - Summer (DST): UTC+02:00 (CEST)
- INSEE/Postal code: 02755 /02000
- ^{1} French Land Register data, which excludes lakes, ponds, glaciers > 1 km^{2} (0.386 sq mi or 247 acres) and river estuaries.

Urcel (French pronunciation: [yʁsɛl]) is a commune in the Aisne department in Hauts-de-France in northern France.

== Geography ==
The river Ailette forms most of the commune's western border.

== Population ==
Historical population
| Year | Pop. | ±% p.a. |
|---|---|---|
| 1968 | 377 | — |
| 1975 | 463 | +2.98% |
| 1982 | 470 | +0.21% |
| 1990 | 502 | +0.83% |
| 1999 | 557 | +1.16% |
| 2007 | 572 | +0.33% |
| 2012 | 532 | −1.44% |
| 2017 | 585 | +1.92% |
| 2023 | 534 | −1.51% |
Source: INSEE

== See also ==
- Communes of the Aisne department
