= Pinon, Aisne =

Pinon
- Commune
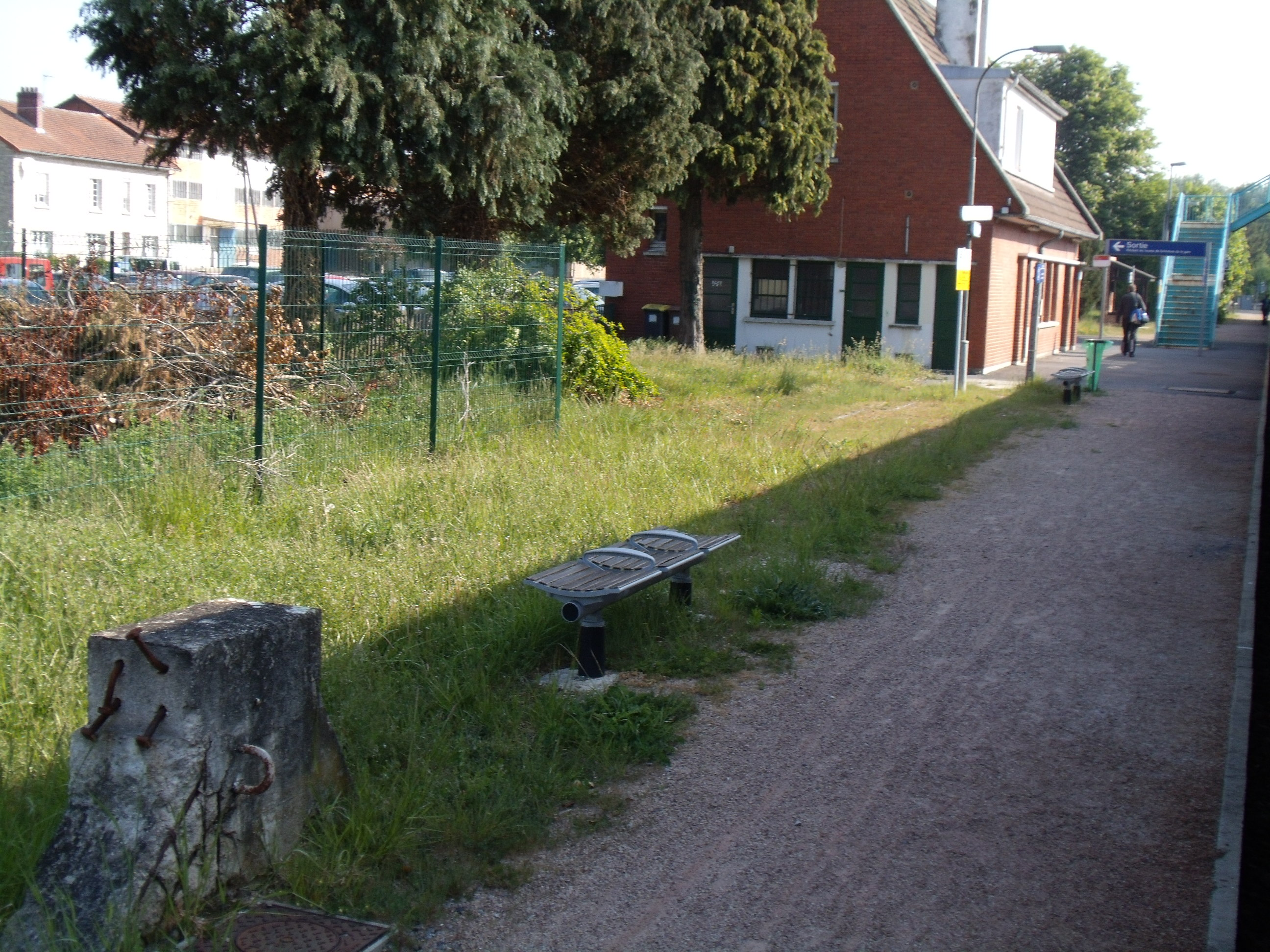
- Train station

- Coat of arms
- Location of Pinon
- Location within France Location within Hauts-de-France
- Coordinates: 49°29′18″N 3°26′47″E
- Country: France
- Region: Hauts-de-France
- Department: Aisne
- Arrondissement: Laon
- Canton: Laon-1

Government
  - Mayor (2026–32): Emmanuel Grazina Boulande
- Area^{1}: 9.48 km^{2} (3.66 sq mi)
- Elevation: 78 m (256 ft)
- Highest elevation: 158 m (518 ft)
- Lowest elevation: 54 m (177 ft)
- Population (2023): 1,637
  - Density: 173/km^{2} (447/sq mi)
- Time zone: UTC+01:00 (CET)
  - Summer (DST): UTC+02:00 (CEST)
- INSEE/Postal code: 02602 /02320
- ^{1} French Land Register data, which excludes lakes, ponds, glaciers > 1 km^{2} (0.386 sq mi or 247 acres) and river estuaries.

Pinon (French pronunciation: [pinɔ̃]) is a commune in the Aisne department in Hauts-de-France in northern France.

== Geography ==
The river Ailette forms all of the commune's northern border.

== Population ==
Historical population
Year	Pop.	±% p.a.
1968	1,807	—
1975	1,916	+0.84%
1982	1,941	+0.19%
1990	1,773	−1.13%
1999	1,711	−0.39%
2007	1,734	+0.17%
2012	1,811	+0.87%
2017	1,765	−0.51%
2023	1,637	−1.25%
Source: INSEE

== See also ==
- Communes of the Aisne department
