= Wissignicourt =

- Commune
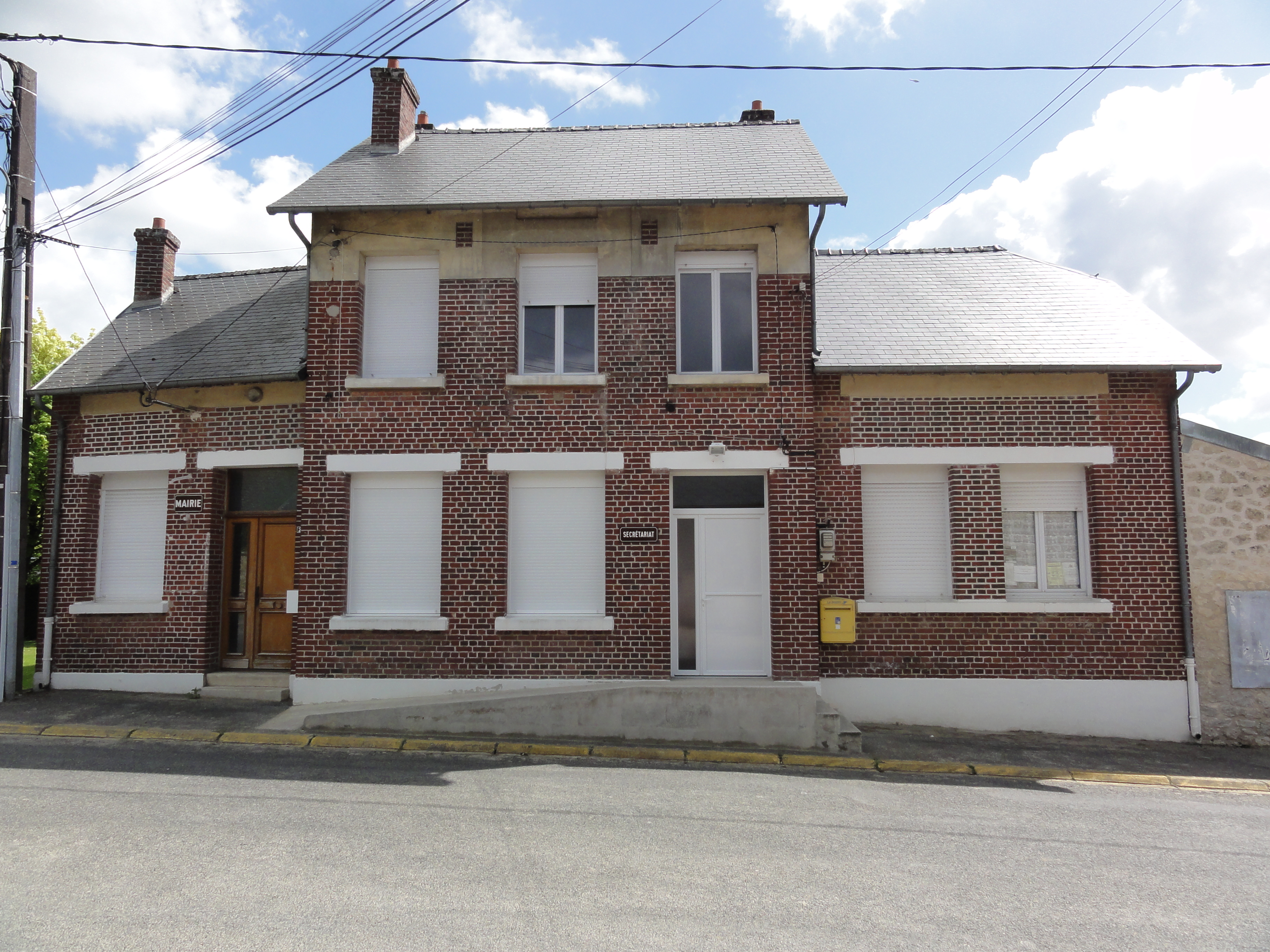
- Town hall
- Location of Wissignicourt
- Location within France Location within Hauts-de-France
- Coordinates: 49°31′26″N 3°26′54″E
- Country: France
- Region: Hauts-de-France
- Department: Aisne
- Arrondissement: Laon
- Canton: Laon-1
- Intercommunality: Picardie des Châteaux

Government
  - Mayor (2026–32): Christophe Vandenbulcke
- Area^{1}: 4.46 km^{2} (1.72 sq mi)
- Elevation: 100 m (330 ft)
- Highest elevation: 191 m (627 ft)
- Lowest elevation: 62 m (203 ft)
- Population (2023): 145
  - Density: 32.5/km^{2} (84.2/sq mi)
- Demonym(s): Wissignicourtois, Wissignicourtoises
- Time zone: UTC+01:00 (CET)
  - Summer (DST): UTC+02:00 (CEST)
- INSEE/Postal code: 02834 /02320
- ^{1} French Land Register data, which excludes lakes, ponds, glaciers > 1 km^{2} (0.386 sq mi or 247 acres) and river estuaries.

Wissignicourt (French pronunciation: [wisiɲikuʁ]) is a commune in the Aisne department in Hauts-de-France in northern France.

== Politics and administration ==
=== Municipal administration ===
List of successive mayors of Wissignicourt
In office		Mayor	Party	Notes
March 2001	March 2008	Pascal Martin		
March 2008	Current	Christophe Vandenbulcke		

== Population ==
Historical population
Year	Pop.	±% p.a.
1968	97	—
1975	125	+3.69%
1982	180	+5.35%
1990	150	−2.25%
1999	142	−0.61%
2007	149	+0.60%
2012	149	+0.00%
2017	167	+2.31%
2023	145	−2.33%
Source: INSEE

== See also ==
- Communes of the Aisne department
