= Merlieux-et-Fouquerolles =

- Commune
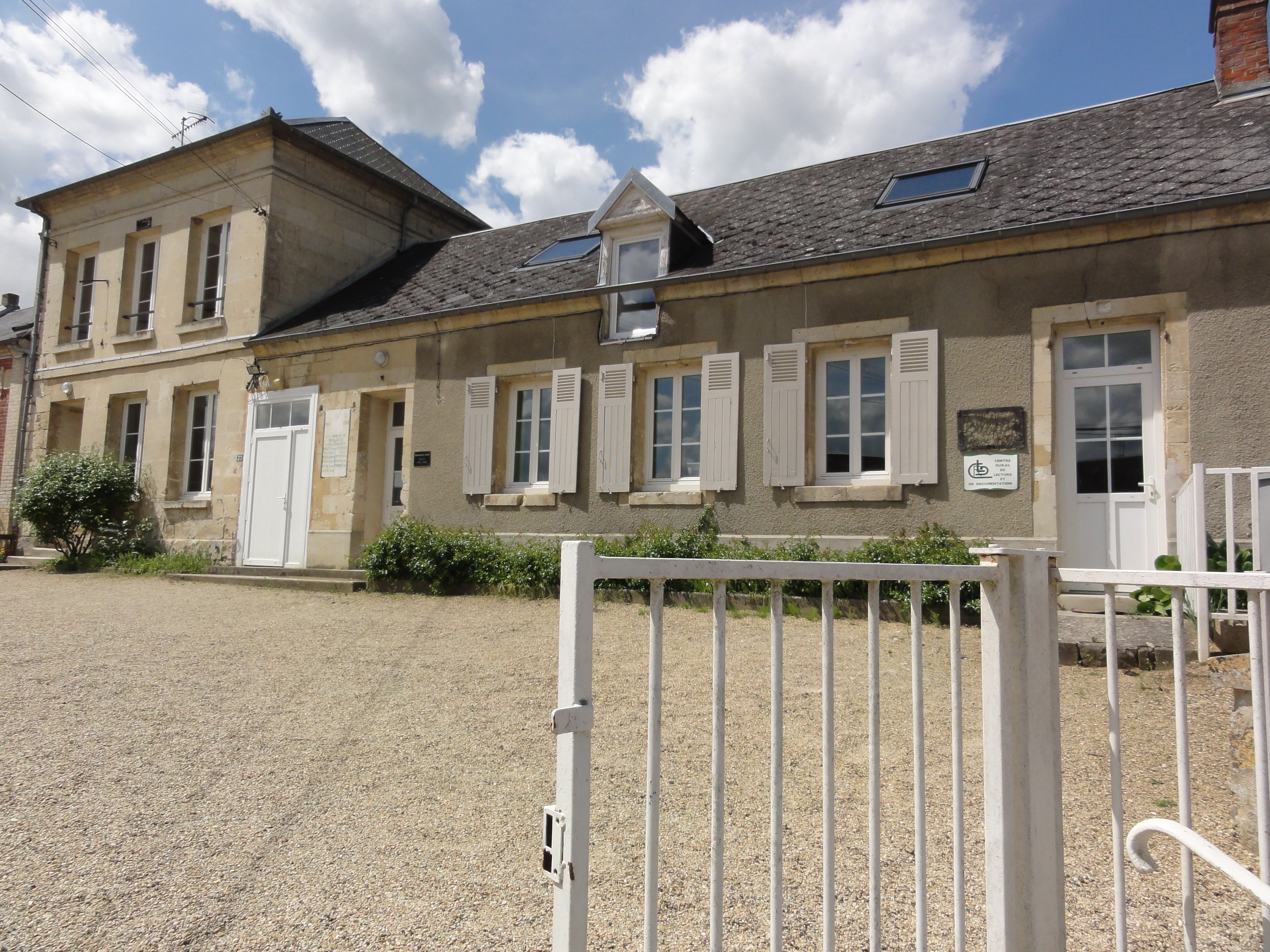
- The town hall of Merlieux-et-Fouquerolles
- Location of Merlieux-et-Fouquerolles
- Location within France Location within Hauts-de-France
- Coordinates: 49°31′04″N 3°30′20″E
- Country: France
- Region: Hauts-de-France
- Department: Aisne
- Arrondissement: Laon
- Canton: Laon-1
- Intercommunality: Picardie des Châteaux

Government
  - Mayor (2026–32): Stéphanie Gillet
- Area^{1}: 5.77 km^{2} (2.23 sq mi)
- Elevation: 84 m (276 ft)
- Highest elevation: 183 m (600 ft)
- Lowest elevation: 58 m (190 ft)
- Population (2023): 253
  - Density: 43.8/km^{2} (114/sq mi)
- Time zone: UTC+01:00 (CET)
  - Summer (DST): UTC+02:00 (CEST)
- INSEE/Postal code: 02478 /02000
- ^{1} French Land Register data, which excludes lakes, ponds, glaciers > 1 km^{2} (0.386 sq mi or 247 acres) and river estuaries.

Merlieux-et-Fouquerolles (French pronunciation: [mɛʁljø e fukʁɔl]) is a commune in the Aisne department in Hauts-de-France in northern France.

== Geography ==
The river Ailette forms all of the commune's southern border.

== Population ==
Historical population
Year	Pop.	±% p.a.
1968	127	—
1975	133	+0.66%
1982	171	+3.66%
1990	185	+0.99%
1999	218	+1.84%
2007	259	+2.18%
2012	279	+1.50%
2017	259	−1.48%
2023	253	−0.39%
Source: INSEE

== See also ==
- Communes of the Aisne department
