= Molinchart =

- Commune
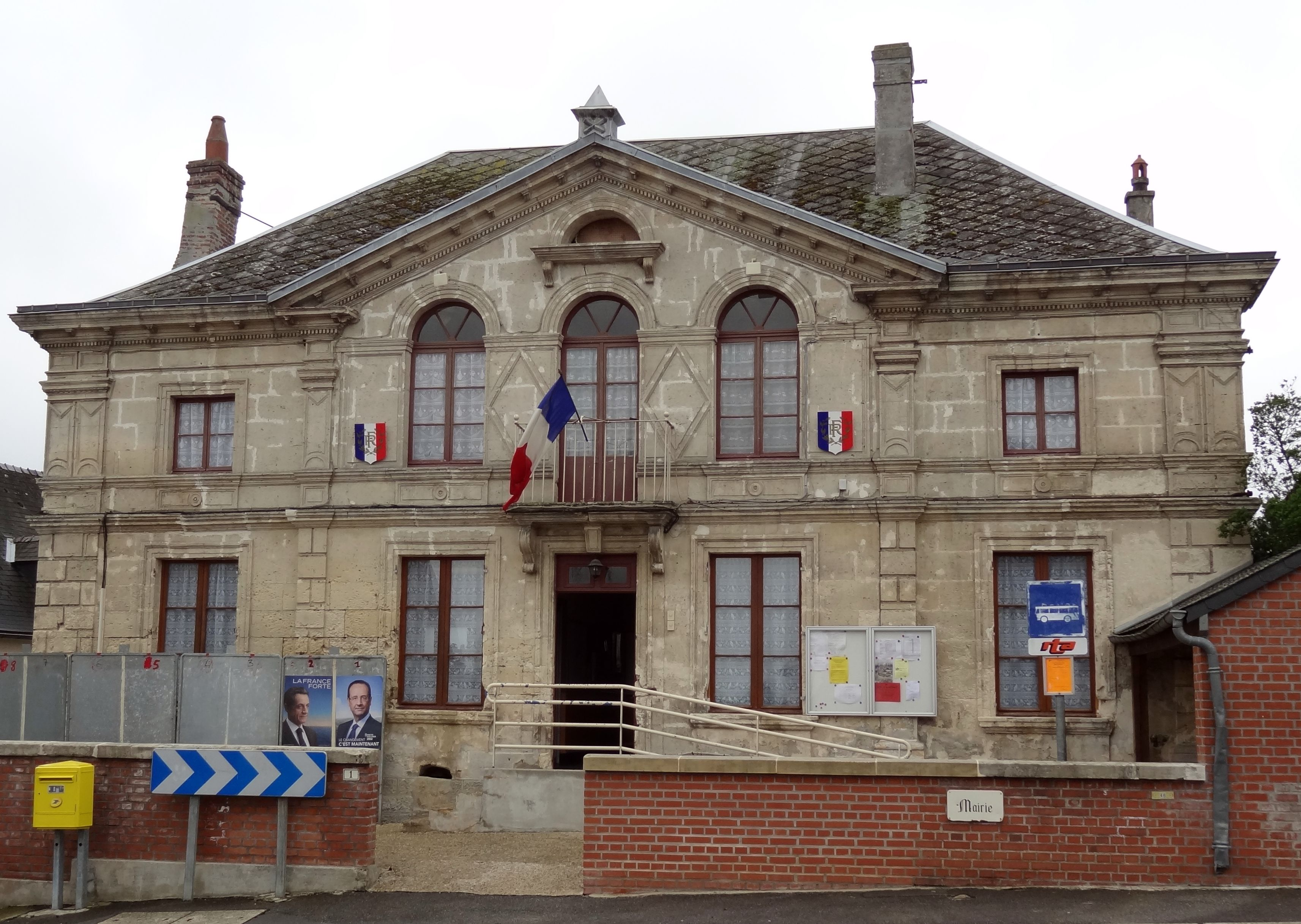
- Town hall
- Location of Molinchart
- Location within France Location within Hauts-de-France
- Coordinates: 49°33′43″N 3°32′29″E
- Country: France
- Region: Hauts-de-France
- Department: Aisne
- Arrondissement: Laon
- Canton: Laon-1
- Intercommunality: CA Pays de Laon

Government
  - Mayor (2026–32): Rémi Carlier
- Area^{1}: 4.47 km^{2} (1.73 sq mi)
- Elevation: 82 m (269 ft)
- Highest elevation: 108 m (354 ft)
- Lowest elevation: 70 m (230 ft)
- Population (2023): 359
  - Density: 80.3/km^{2} (208/sq mi)
- Time zone: UTC+01:00 (CET)
  - Summer (DST): UTC+02:00 (CEST)
- INSEE/Postal code: 02489 /02000
- ^{1} French Land Register data, which excludes lakes, ponds, glaciers > 1 km^{2} (0.386 sq mi or 247 acres) and river estuaries.

Molinchart (French pronunciation: [mɔlɛ̃ʃaʁ]) is a commune in the Aisne department in Hauts-de-France in northern France.

== Population ==
Historical population
Year	Pop.	±% p.a.
1968	236	—
1975	201	−2.27%
1982	223	+1.49%
1990	271	+2.47%
1999	276	+0.20%
2007	292	+0.71%
2012	326	+2.23%
2017	329	+0.18%
2023	359	+1.47%
Source: INSEE

== See also ==
- Communes of the Aisne department
