= Vaucelles-et-Beffecourt =

- Commune
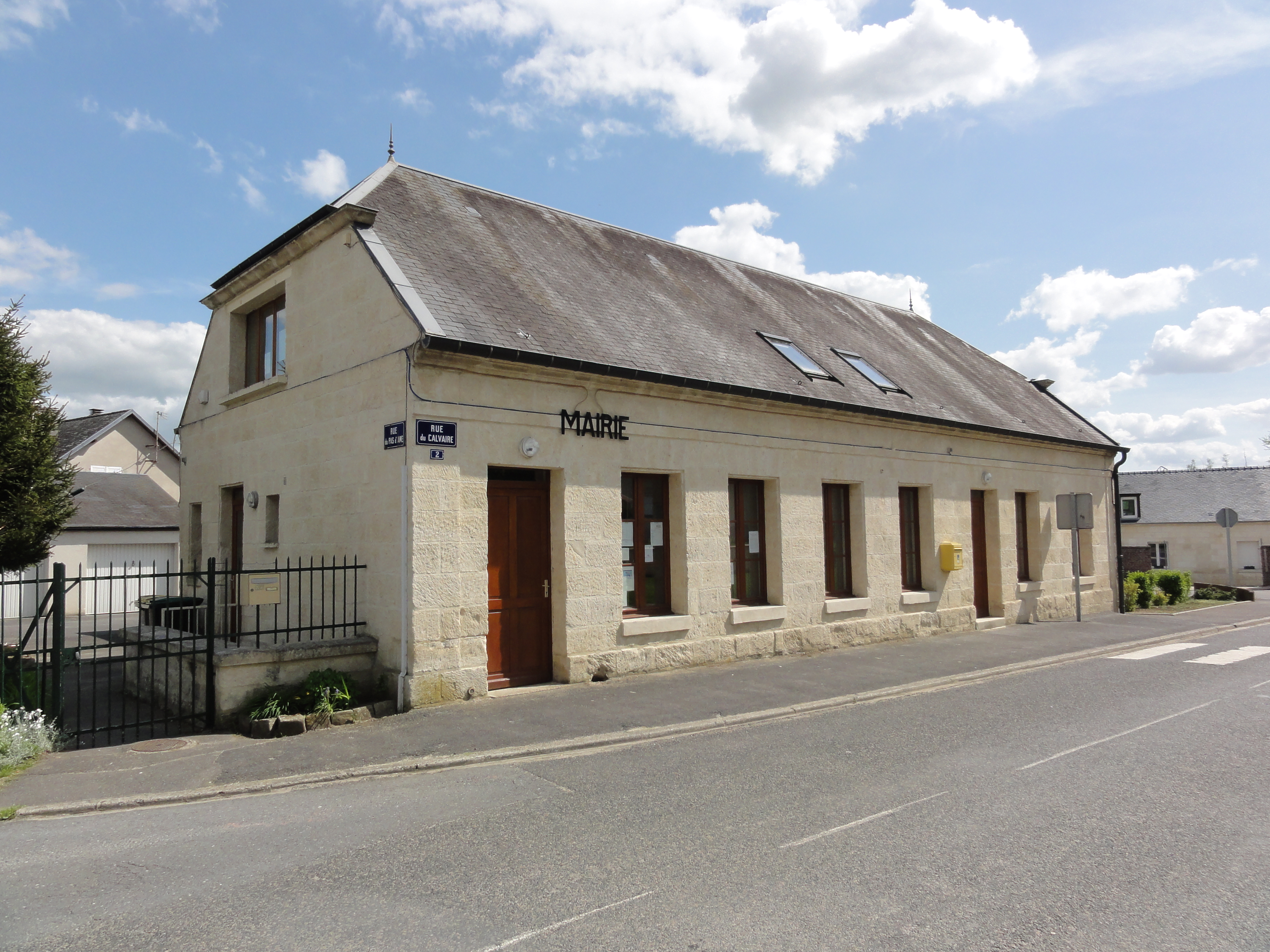
- The town hall of Vaucelles-et-Beffecourt
- Location of Vaucelles-et-Beffecourt
- Location within France Location within Hauts-de-France
- Coordinates: 49°31′49″N 3°33′22″E
- Country: France
- Region: Hauts-de-France
- Department: Aisne
- Arrondissement: Laon
- Canton: Laon-1
- Intercommunality: CA Pays de Laon

Government
  - Mayor (2026–32): Mathieu Fraise
- Area^{1}: 4.03 km^{2} (1.56 sq mi)
- Elevation: 64 m (210 ft)
- Highest elevation: 168 m (551 ft)
- Lowest elevation: 58 m (190 ft)
- Population (2023): 230
  - Density: 57/km^{2} (150/sq mi)
- Time zone: UTC+01:00 (CET)
  - Summer (DST): UTC+02:00 (CEST)
- INSEE/Postal code: 02765 /02000
- ^{1} French Land Register data, which excludes lakes, ponds, glaciers > 1 km^{2} (0.386 sq mi or 247 acres) and river estuaries.

Vaucelles-et-Beffecourt (French pronunciation: [vosɛl e bɛfkuʁ]) is a commune in the Aisne department in Hauts-de-France in northern France.

== Population ==
Historical population
Year	Pop.	±% p.a.
1968	146	—
1975	157	+1.04%
1982	197	+3.30%
1990	213	+0.98%
1999	196	−0.92%
2007	217	+1.28%
2012	214	−0.28%
2017	265	+4.37%
2023	230	−2.33%
Source: INSEE

== See also ==
- Communes of the Aisne department
