= Bassoles-Aulers =

- Commune
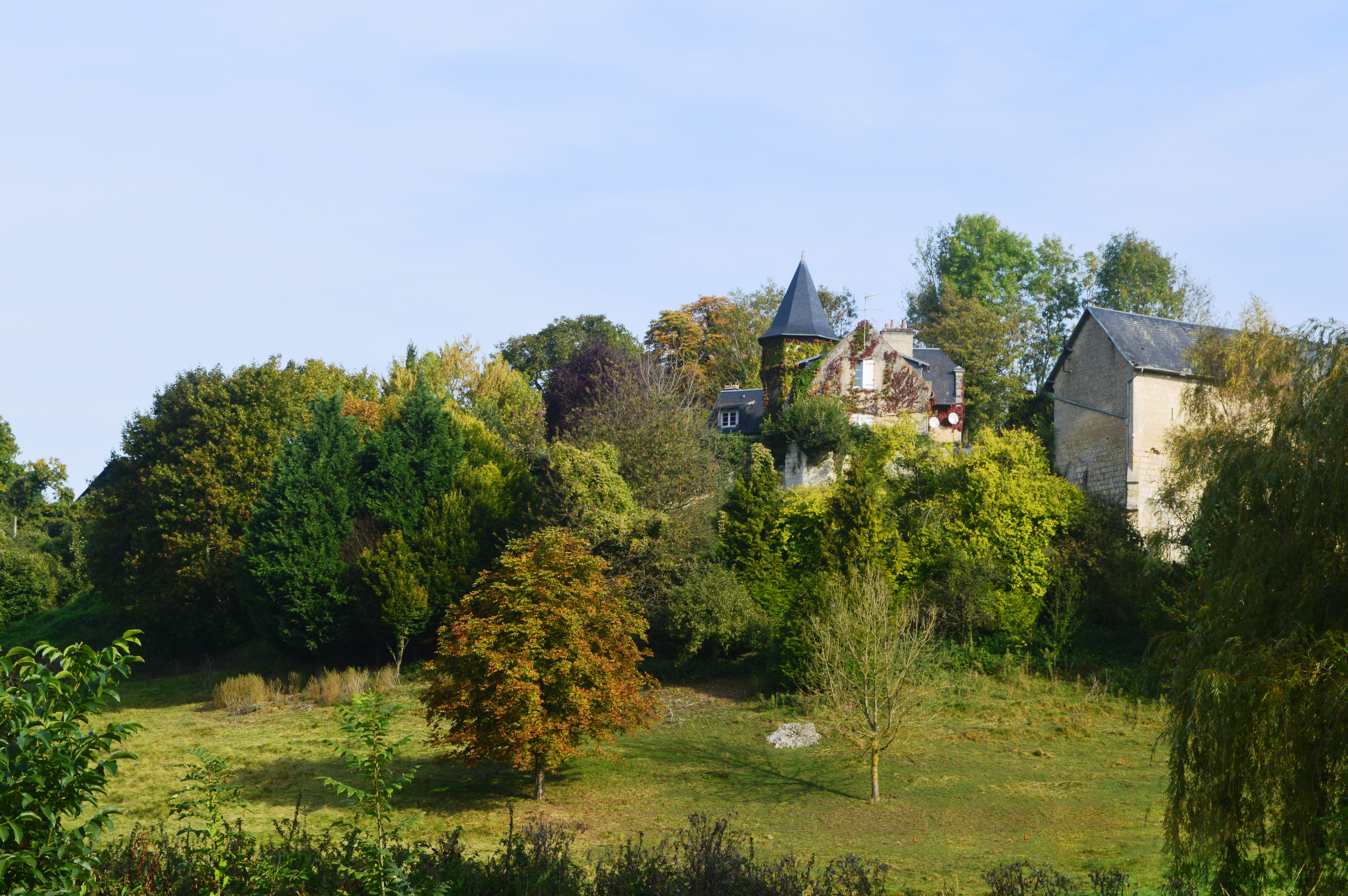
- Location of Bassoles-Aulers
- Location within France Location within Hauts-de-France
- Coordinates: 49°31′37″N 3°22′56″E
- Country: France
- Region: Hauts-de-France
- Department: Aisne
- Arrondissement: Laon
- Canton: Laon-1
- Intercommunality: Picardie des Châteaux

Government
  - Mayor (2026–32): Isabelle Herbulot
- Area^{1}: 7.03 km^{2} (2.71 sq mi)
- Elevation: 100 m (330 ft)
- Highest elevation: 200 m (660 ft)
- Lowest elevation: 80 m (260 ft)
- Population (2023): 131
  - Density: 18.6/km^{2} (48.3/sq mi)
- Time zone: UTC+01:00 (CET)
  - Summer (DST): UTC+02:00 (CEST)
- INSEE/Postal code: 02052 /02380
- ^{1} French Land Register data, which excludes lakes, ponds, glaciers > 1 km^{2} (0.386 sq mi or 247 acres) and river estuaries.

Bassoles-Aulers is a commune in the department of Aisne in the Hauts-de-France region of northern France.

== Geography ==
Bassoles-Aulers is located some 18 km southeast of Chauny and 15 km east by southeast of Laon. Access to the commune is by road D532 which runs off the D5 in a loop through the commune and the village then back to the D5 near Quincy-Basse. The D13 road also forms part of the northern border of the commune and links to two country roads leading to the commune and the village. The commune is heavily forested in the north, east, and south with areas of farmland in the centre and west of the village. There are three hamlets in the commune apart from the village: Le Fau, Les Berceaux, and Marimont.

The Ru de Basse rises south of the village and flows south to join the Canal of Oise and Aisne.

== History ==
The church was rebuilt after the First World War by André Perrin.

== Administration ==
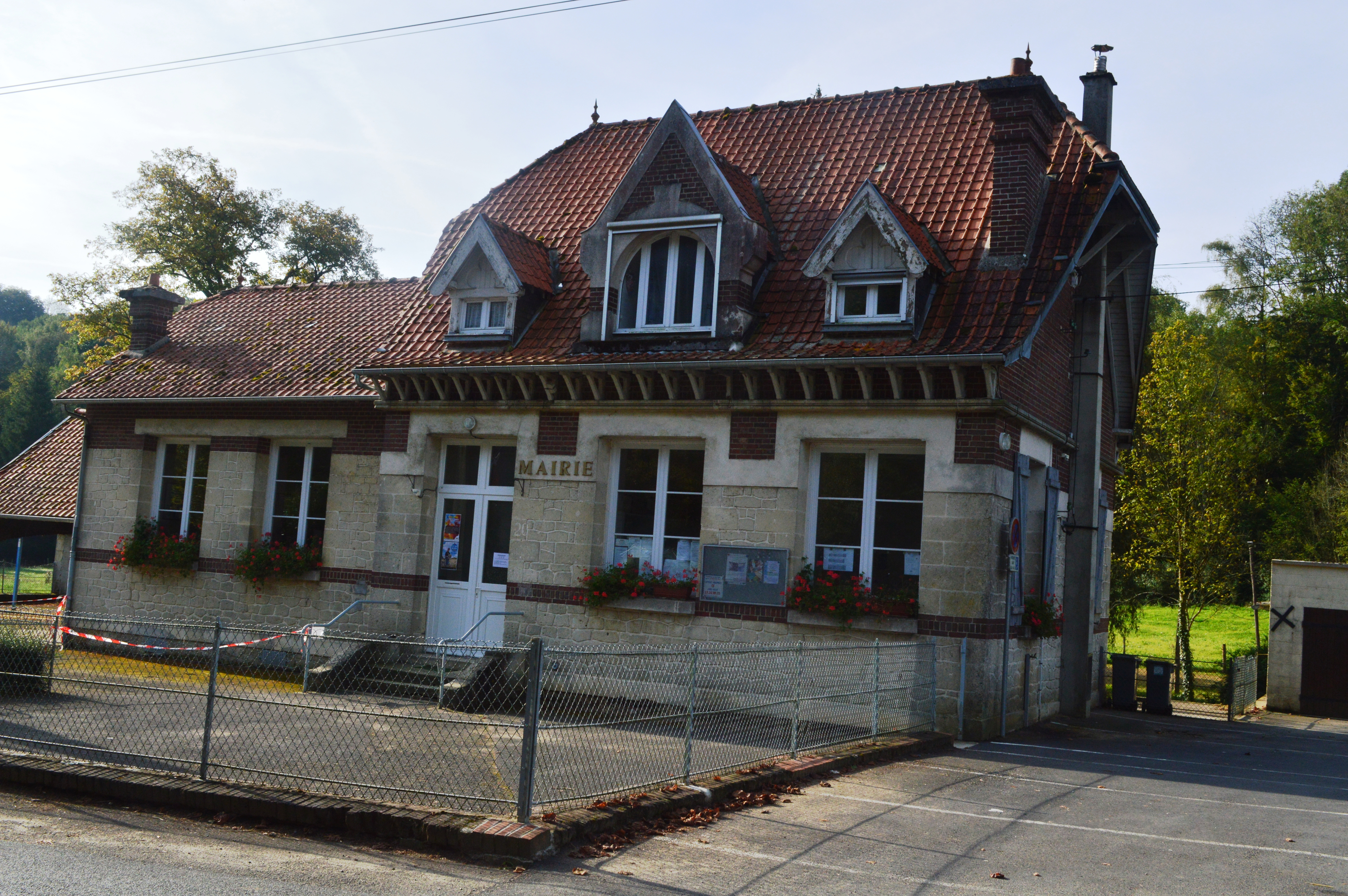
The Town Hall

List of Successive Mayors of Bassoles-Aulers

From	To	Name	Party
2001	2008	Alain Hubeau	UMP
2008	2014	Jacques Trichet	
2014	Present	Isabelle Herbulot	

== Population ==
Historical population
Year	Pop.	±% p.a.
1968	157	—
1975	140	−1.62%
1982	146	+0.60%
1990	121	−2.32%
1999	144	+1.95%
2007	136	−0.71%
2012	139	+0.44%
2017	139	+0.00%
2023	131	−0.98%
Source: INSEE

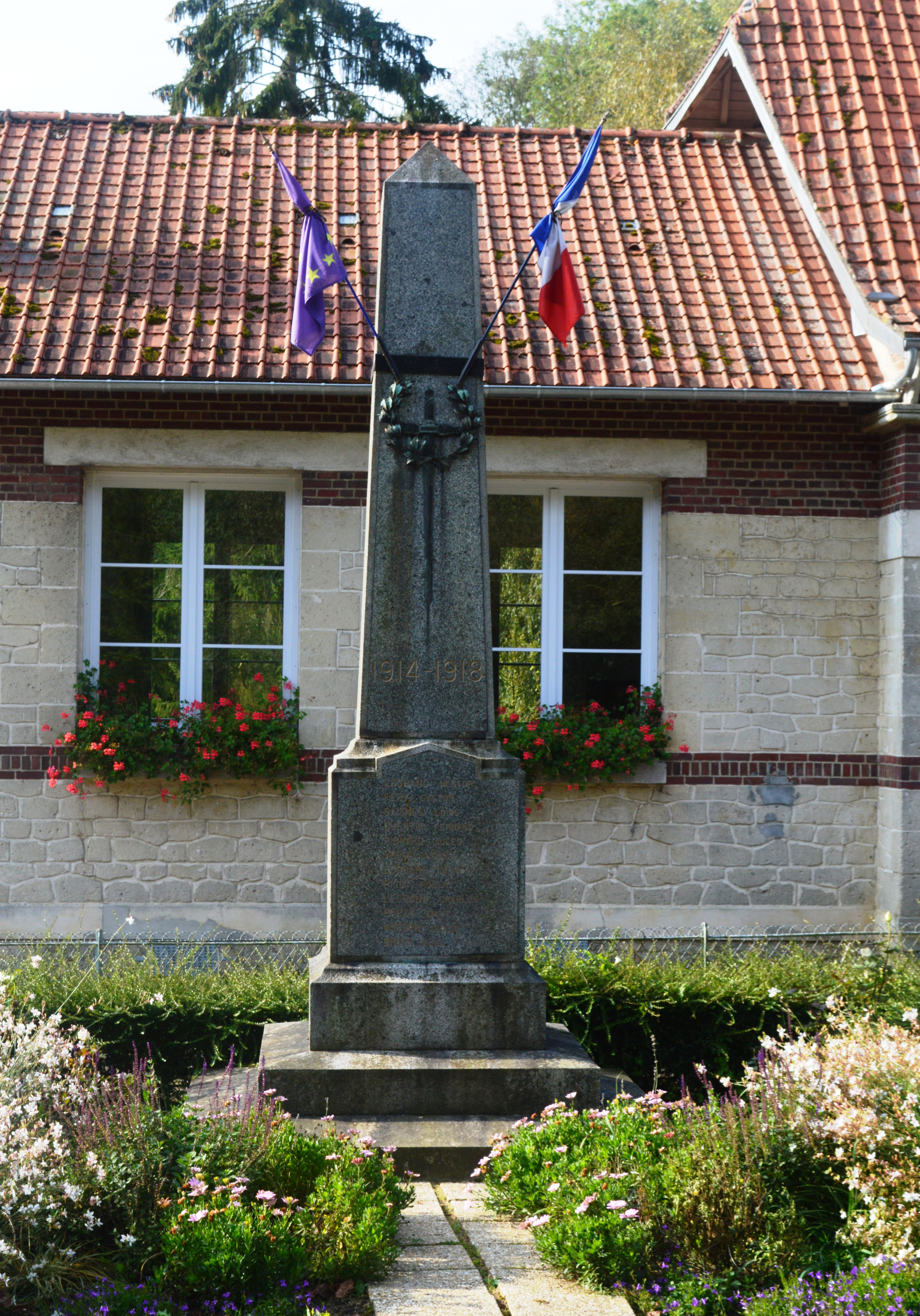
Bassoles-Aulers War Memorial

== Sites and monuments ==
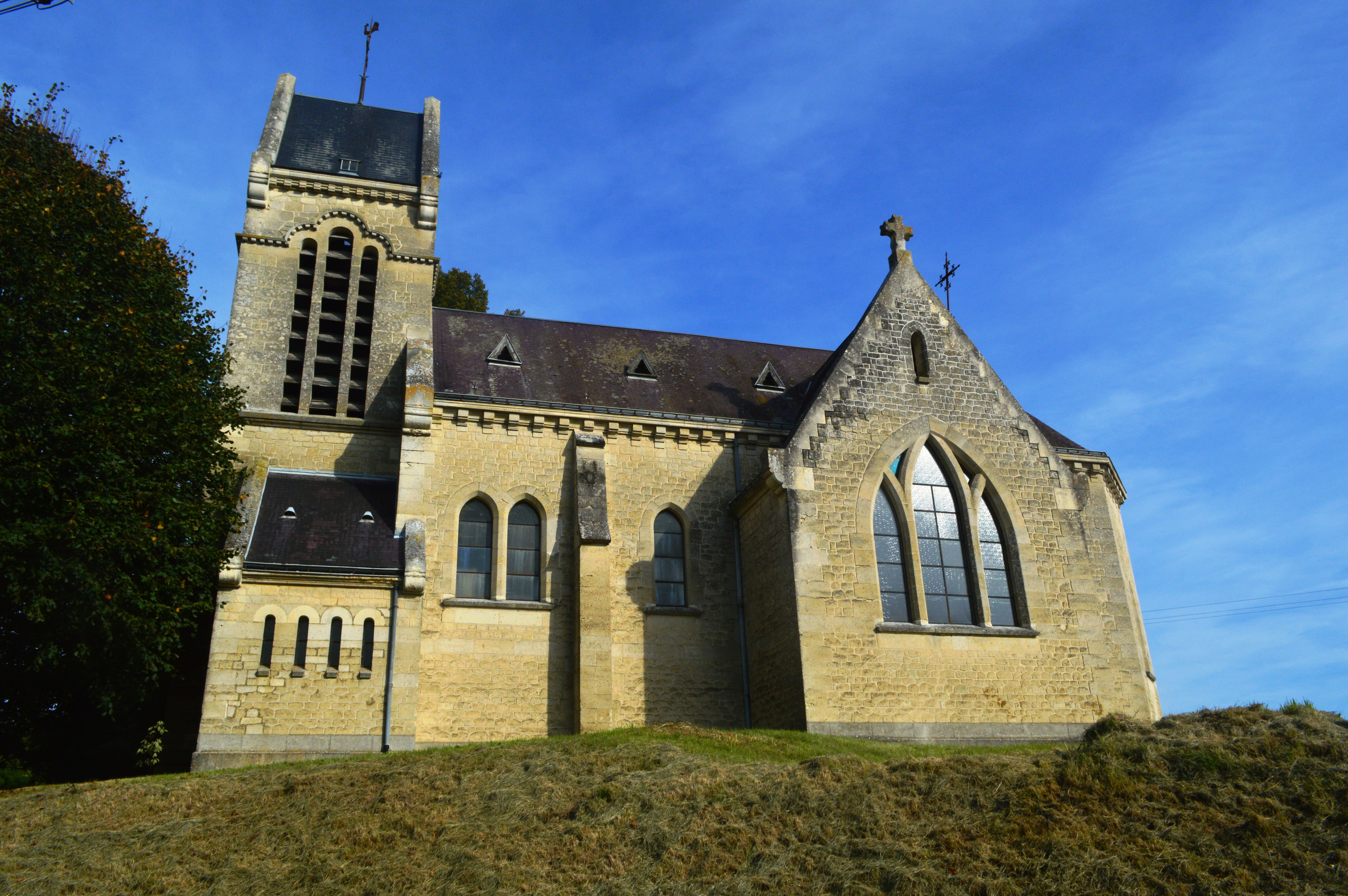
Bassoles-Aulers Church

The Church contains two items that are registered as historical objects:

- A Baptismal font (12th century)
- A Bronze Bell (1630)

== Notable People linked to the commune ==
- André Perrin (1881-1969): Chevalier (1915) then Officer (1936) of the National Order of the Legion of Honour. Officer of the Academy. Croix de Guerre, Croix des Services Militaires Volontaires, and Chevalier in the Ordre du Mérite militaire (National Order of Military Merit) (1961). Architect who built the school and rebuilt the church after the War of 1914-1918.

== See also ==
- Communes of the Aisne department
