= Cerny-lès-Bucy =

- Commune
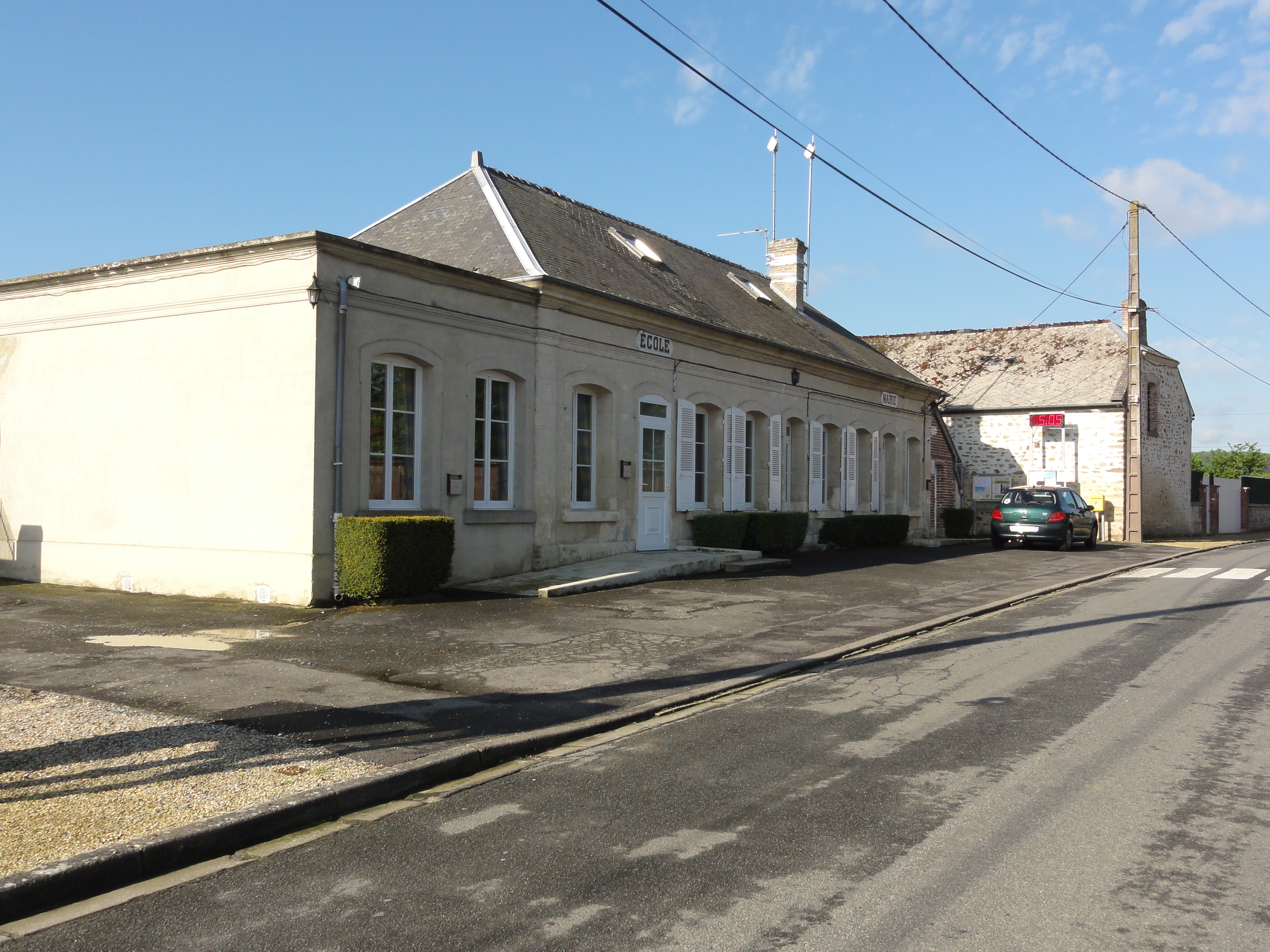
- The town hall and school of Cerny-lès-Bucy

- Coat of arms
- Location of Cerny-lès-Bucy
- Location within France Location within Hauts-de-France
- Coordinates: 49°34′42″N 3°32′58″E
- Country: France
- Region: Hauts-de-France
- Department: Aisne
- Arrondissement: Laon
- Canton: Laon-1
- Intercommunality: CA Pays de Laon

Government
  - Mayor (2026–32): Thomas Alglave
- Area^{1}: 3.19 km^{2} (1.23 sq mi)
- Highest elevation: 96 m (315 ft)
- Lowest elevation: 73 m (240 ft)
- Population (2023): 111
  - Density: 34.8/km^{2} (90.1/sq mi)
- Time zone: UTC+01:00 (CET)
  - Summer (DST): UTC+02:00 (CEST)
- INSEE/Postal code: 02151 /02870
- ^{1} French Land Register data, which excludes lakes, ponds, glaciers > 1 km^{2} (0.386 sq mi or 247 acres) and river estuaries.

Cerny-lès-Bucy is a commune in the Aisne department in Hauts-de-France in northern France.

== Population ==
Historical population
Year	Pop.	±% p.a.
1968	113	—
1975	107	−0.78%
1982	100	−0.96%
1990	113	+1.54%
1999	114	+0.10%
2007	114	+0.00%
2012	112	−0.35%
2017	115	+0.53%
2023	111	−0.59%
Source: INSEE

== See also ==
- Communes of the Aisne department
