= Vivaise =

- Commune
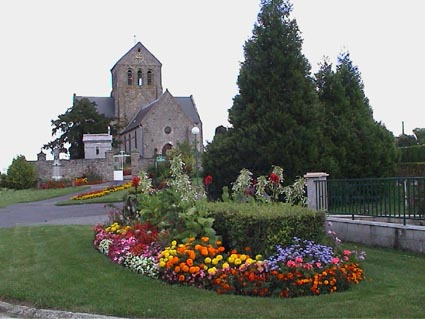
- The church of Vivaise
- Location of Vivaise
- Location within France Location within Hauts-de-France
- Coordinates: 49°37′18″N 3°33′42″E
- Country: France
- Region: Hauts-de-France
- Department: Aisne
- Arrondissement: Laon
- Canton: Laon-1
- Intercommunality: CA Pays de Laon

Government
  - Mayor (2026–32): Jean-Marc Vianas
- Area^{1}: 9.02 km^{2} (3.48 sq mi)
- Elevation: 74 m (243 ft)
- Highest elevation: 118 m (387 ft)
- Lowest elevation: 65 m (213 ft)
- Population (2023): 654
  - Density: 72.5/km^{2} (188/sq mi)
- Time zone: UTC+01:00 (CET)
  - Summer (DST): UTC+02:00 (CEST)
- INSEE/Postal code: 02821 /02870
- ^{1} French Land Register data, which excludes lakes, ponds, glaciers > 1 km^{2} (0.386 sq mi or 247 acres) and river estuaries.

Vivaise (French pronunciation: [vivɛz]) is a commune in the Aisne department in Hauts-de-France in northern France.

== Population ==
Historical population
| Year | Pop. | ±% p.a. |
|---|---|---|
| 1968 | 292 | — |
| 1975 | 448 | +6.31% |
| 1982 | 660 | +5.69% |
| 1990 | 704 | +0.81% |
| 1999 | 702 | −0.03% |
| 2007 | 765 | +1.08% |
| 2012 | 757 | −0.21% |
| 2017 | 698 | −1.61% |
| 2023 | 654 | −1.08% |
Source: INSEE

== See also ==
- Communes of the Aisne department
