= Montbavin =

- Commune
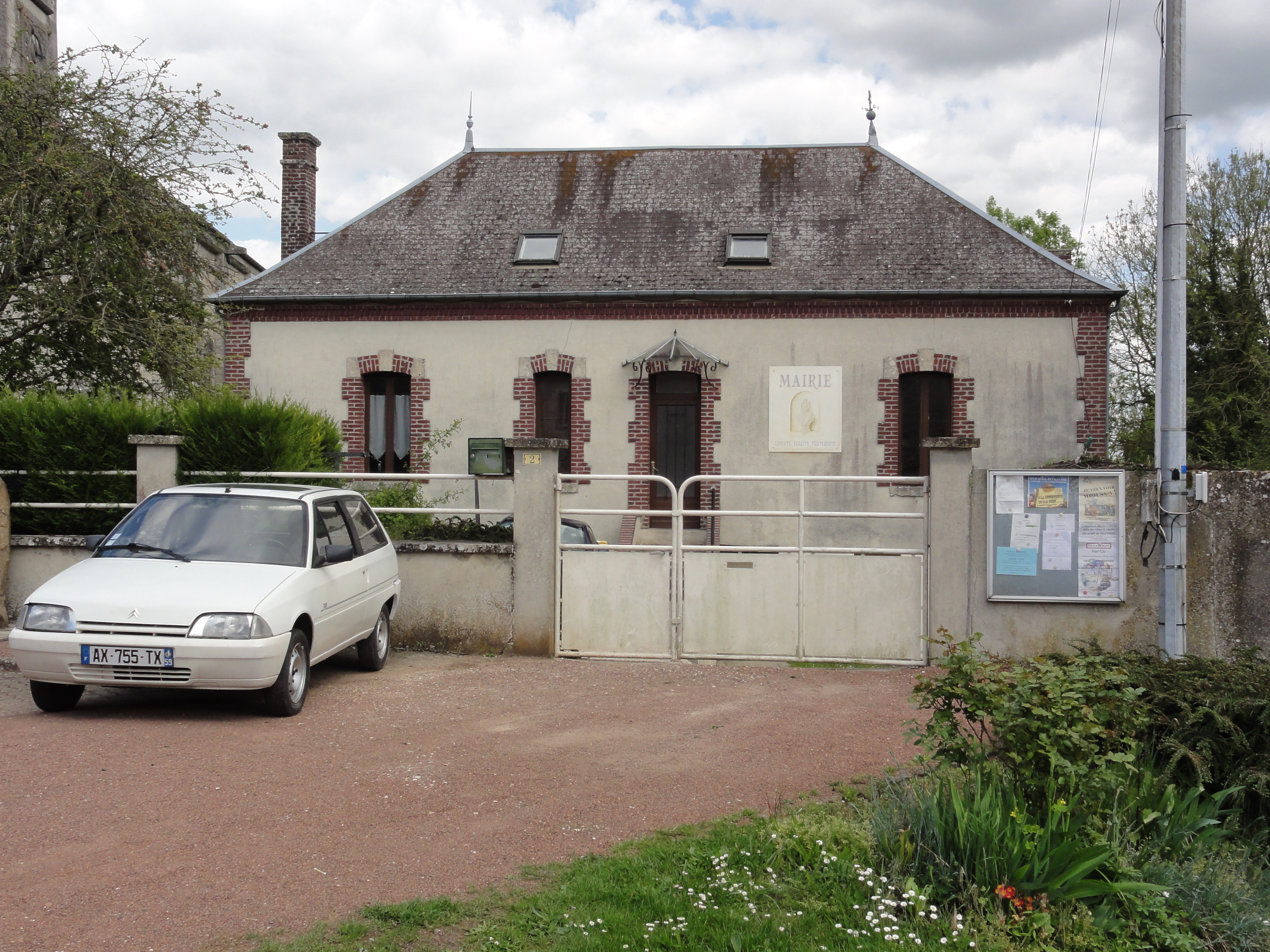
- The town hall of Montbavin
- Location of Montbavin
- Location within France Location within Hauts-de-France
- Coordinates: 49°31′23″N 3°31′44″E
- Country: France
- Region: Hauts-de-France
- Department: Aisne
- Arrondissement: Laon
- Canton: Laon-1
- Intercommunality: Picardie des Châteaux

Government
  - Mayor (2026–32): Alexandre Tellier
- Area^{1}: 5.44 km^{2} (2.10 sq mi)
- Highest elevation: 193 m (633 ft)
- Lowest elevation: 67 m (220 ft)
- Population (2023): 39
  - Density: 7.2/km^{2} (19/sq mi)
- Time zone: UTC+01:00 (CET)
  - Summer (DST): UTC+02:00 (CEST)
- INSEE/Postal code: 02499 /02000
- ^{1} French Land Register data, which excludes lakes, ponds, glaciers > 1 km^{2} (0.386 sq mi or 247 acres) and river estuaries.

Montbavin (French pronunciation: [mɔ̃bavɛ̃]) is a commune in the Aisne department in Hauts-de-France in northern France.

== Population ==
Historical population
Year	Pop.	±% p.a.
1968	41	—
1975	36	−1.84%
1982	50	+4.80%
1990	42	−2.16%
1999	35	−2.01%
2007	36	+0.35%
2012	47	+5.48%
2017	44	−1.31%
2023	39	−1.99%
Source: INSEE

== See also ==
- Communes of the Aisne department
