= Canton of La Fère =

Coordinates: 49°40′N 3°22′E

La Fère
- Former canton
- Interactive map of La Fère
- Country: France
- Region: Hauts-de-France
- Department: Aisne
- No. of communes: {{{nbcomm}}}
- Disbanded: 2015
- Area: 154.52 km^{2} (59.66 sq mi)
- Population (2012): 12,506
  - Density: 80.935/km^{2} (209.62/sq mi)

The canton of La Fère is a former administrative division in northern France. It was disbanded following the French canton reorganisation which came into effect in March 2015. It consisted of 20 communes that joined the canton of Tergnier in 2015. It had 3,299 inhabitants (2012).

The canton comprised the following communes:

- Achery
- Andelain
- Anguilcourt-le-Sart
- Bertaucourt-Epourdon
- Brie
- Charmes
- Courbes
- Danizy
- Deuillet
- La Fère
- Fourdrain
- Fressancourt
- Mayot
- Monceau-lès-Leups
- Rogécourt
- Saint-Gobain
- Saint-Nicolas-aux-Bois
- Servais
- Travecy
- Versigny

== Demographics ==
Historical population Canton of La Fère
Year	1962	1968	1975	1982	1990	1999
Pop.	12,798	13,813	12,778	12,093	12,045	11,931
±%	—	+7.9%	−7.5%	−5.4%	−0.4%	−0.9%
From the year 1962 on: No double counting – residents of multiple communes (e.g. students and military personnel) are counted only once. Source: INSEE

== See also ==
- Cantons of the Aisne department
