= Andelain =

- Commune
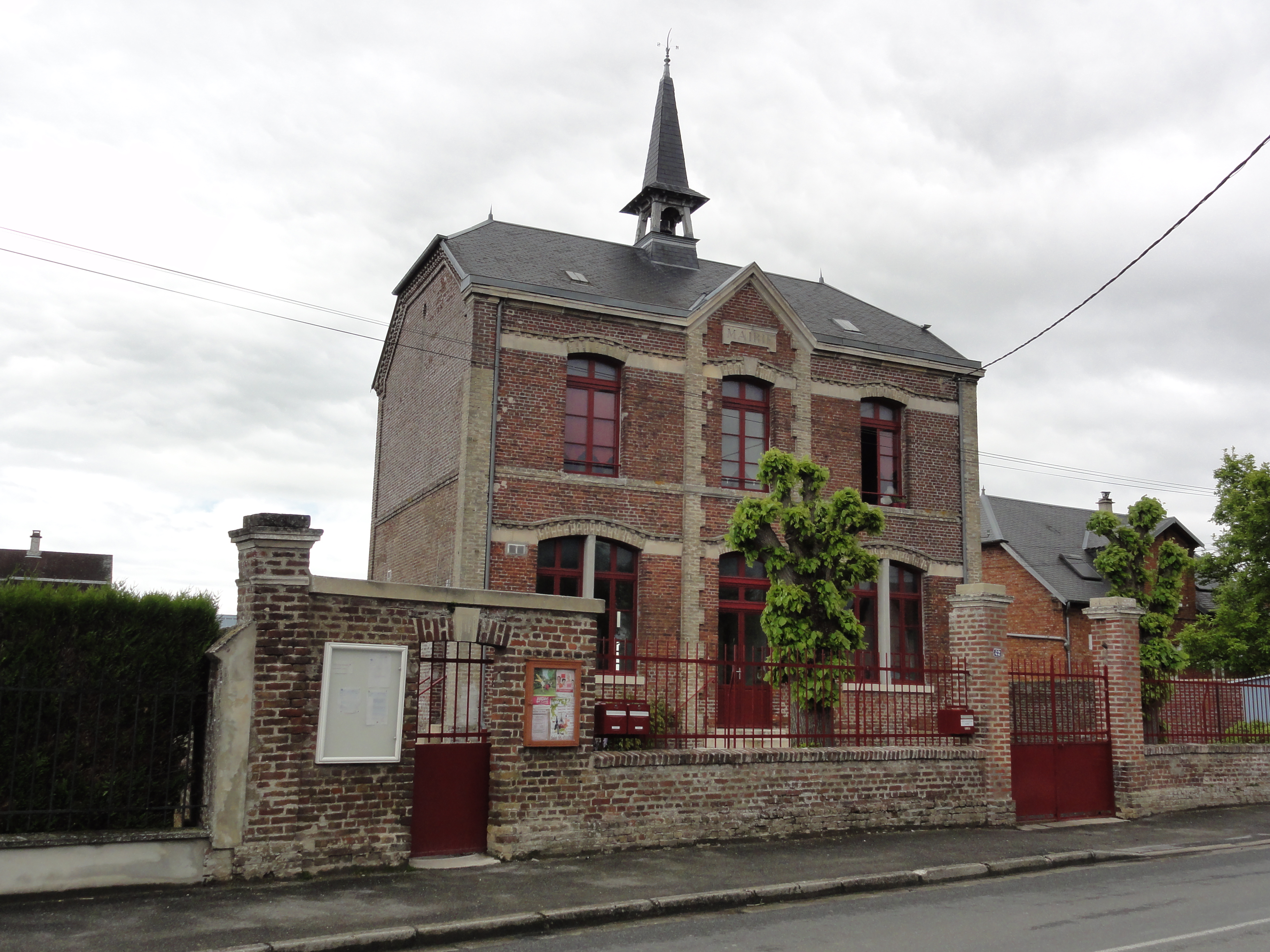
- Town hall
- Location of Andelain
- Location within France Location within Hauts-de-France
- Coordinates: 49°38′36″N 3°22′16″E
- Country: France
- Region: Hauts-de-France
- Department: Aisne
- Arrondissement: Laon
- Canton: Tergnier
- Intercommunality: CA Chauny Tergnier La Fère

Government
  - Mayor (2026–32): David Rohart
- Area^{1}: 2.91 km^{2} (1.12 sq mi)
- Elevation: 112 m (367 ft)
- Highest elevation: 106 m (348 ft)
- Lowest elevation: 47 m (154 ft)
- Population (2023): 212
  - Density: 72.9/km^{2} (189/sq mi)
- Time zone: UTC+01:00 (CET)
  - Summer (DST): UTC+02:00 (CEST)
- INSEE/Postal code: 02016 /02800
- ^{1} French Land Register data, which excludes lakes, ponds, glaciers > 1 km^{2} (0.386 sq mi or 247 acres) and river estuaries.

Andelain (French pronunciation: [ɑ̃dlɛ̃]) is a commune in the Aisne department and Hauts-de-France region of northern France.

== Geography ==
Andelain is located some 24 km south-southeast of Saint Quentin and 4 km east of Tergnier. It can be accessed by the D13 road from Charmes in the northeast passing through the village and continuing to Deuillet in the southwest. The D1032 road also runs through the north of the commune from west to east and the D553 road cuts through the southwestern corner of the commune. Apart from the village the commune consists entirely of farmland with no other villages or hamlets.

The Oise river forms a small part of the northwestern border of the commune and a stream flows through the northwestern part of the commune into the Oise river.

== Population ==
Historical population
Year	Pop.	±% p.a.
1968	168	—
1975	157	−0.96%
1982	160	+0.27%
1990	163	+0.23%
1999	159	−0.28%
2007	175	+1.21%
2012	197	+2.40%
2017	228	+2.97%
2023	212	−1.21%
Source: INSEE

== Culture and heritage ==
=== Civil heritage ===
- The Park of the Maguin Chateau (19th century) is registered as an historical monument.

=== Religious heritage ===
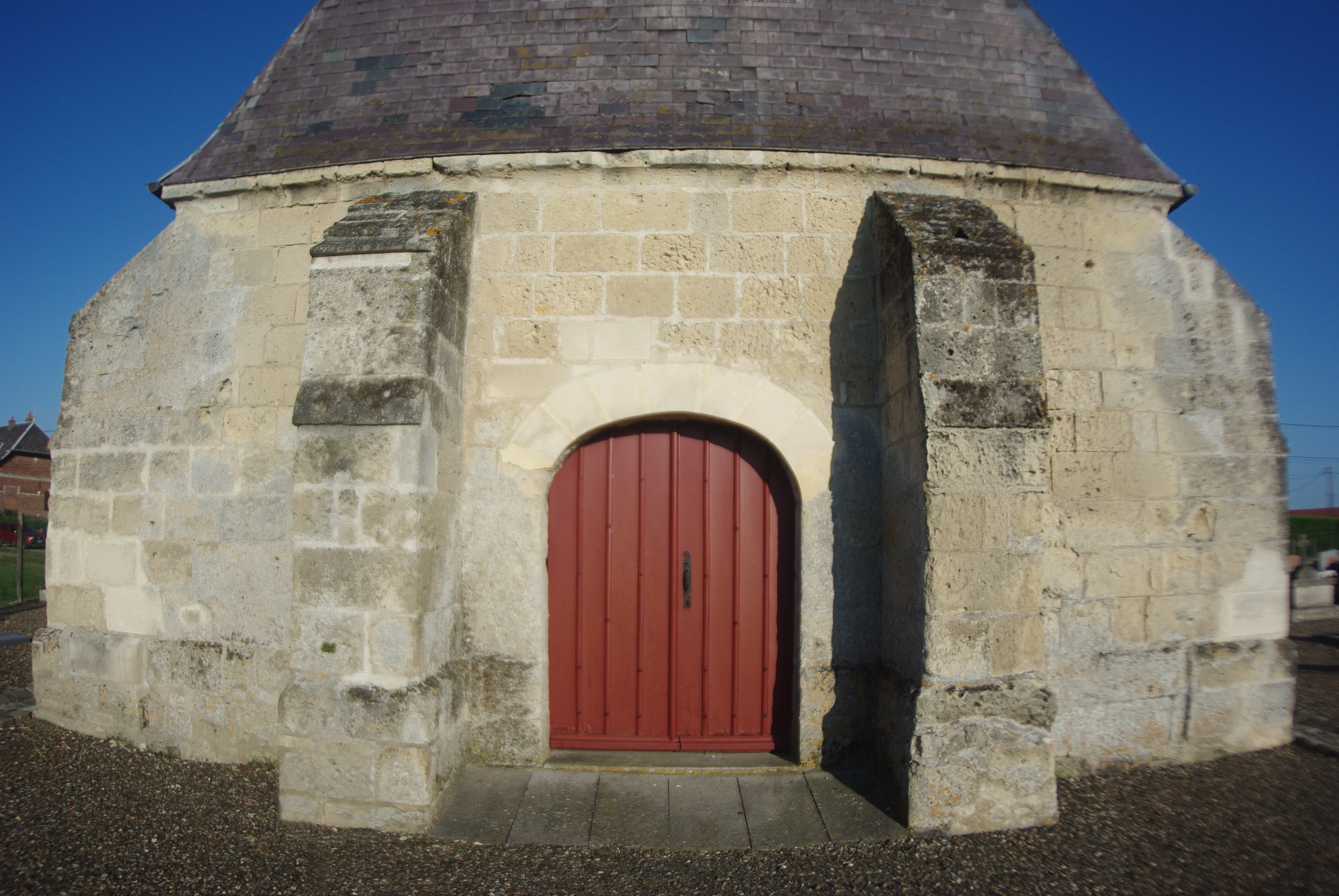
Church of Saint-Denis

The Church of Saint-Denis (12th century). is registered as an historical monument. The Church contains several items that are registered as historical objects:

- A Fragment of a Retable (18th century)
- A Statue: Saint Eveque seated (17th century)
- A Statue: Saint Sebastian (17th century)
- A Baptismal pool (15th century)
- A Baptismal pool (15th century)
- A Statue: Saint Barbe (16th century)
- A Statue: Saint Antoine (16th century)
- A Group Sculpture: Christ on the Cross with the Virgin and Saint John (15th century)
- Stained glass windows (16th century)

== See also ==
- Communes of the Aisne department
