= Achery, Aisne =

Achery
- Commune
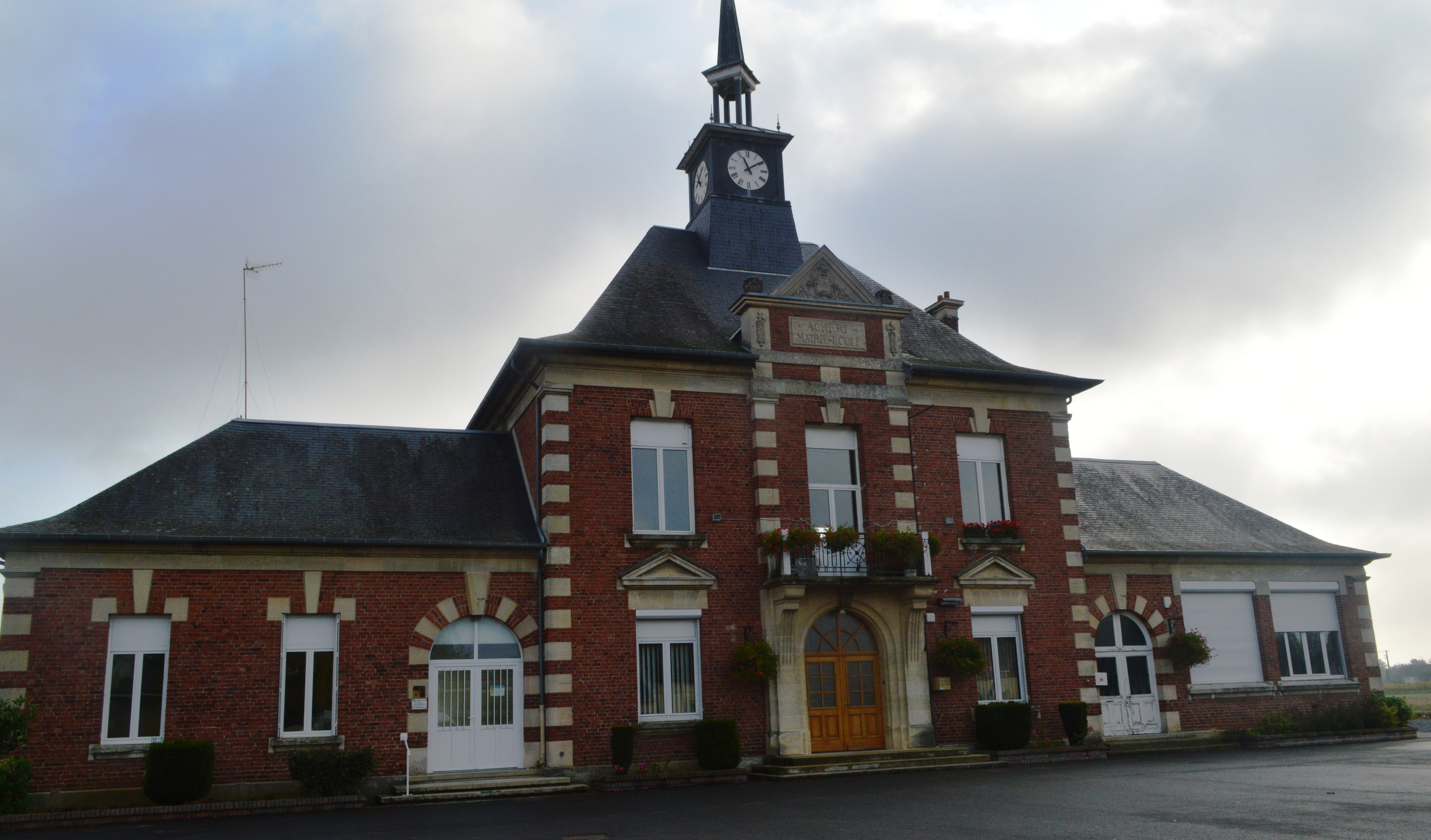
- Town hall
- Location of Achery
- Location within France Location within Hauts-de-France
- Coordinates: 49°41′35″N 3°23′26″E
- Country: France
- Region: Hauts-de-France
- Department: Aisne
- Arrondissement: Laon
- Canton: Tergnier
- Intercommunality: CA Chauny Tergnier La Fère

Government
  - Mayor (2026–32): Fabrice Gosset
- Area^{1}: 6.9 km^{2} (2.7 sq mi)
- Elevation: 50 m (160 ft)
- Highest elevation: 103 m (338 ft)
- Lowest elevation: 48 m (157 ft)
- Population (2023): 584
  - Density: 85/km^{2} (220/sq mi)
- Time zone: UTC+01:00 (CET)
  - Summer (DST): UTC+02:00 (CEST)
- INSEE/Postal code: 02002 /02800
- ^{1} French Land Register data, which excludes lakes, ponds, glaciers > 1 km^{2} (0.386 sq mi or 247 acres) and river estuaries.

Achery is a commune in the department of Aisne in the Hauts-de-France region of northern France.

== Geography ==
Achery is located some 20 km south by southeast of Saint-Quentin and 10 km north-east of Tergnier. The commune is on the Oise river which flows south forming the north-western border of the commune before flowing through the commune and continuing south. The tributary of the Oise, the Serre, forms the southern border of the commune before joining the Oise just south of Achery. The town of Achery is about 1.5 km directly south of Mayot on D 13 road which passes through Achery south to Danizy. Other roads into the commune are the D 643 (Rue Jules Lesage) west from the village to Travecy and also east (Rue Jean Moulin) to Anguilcourt-le-Sart. The Rue du Fort forms most of the northern border of the commune with various country roads forming most of the western border.

=== Neighbouring communes and villages ===
Some distance from the village there is a quarry and an old gunpowder factory.

== History ==
In the distant past, the village was called Achiriacus in 990.

Achery had its own lords. The lordship had his castle but it was destroyed once before being rebuilt in the 14th century. The lordship fell to the Count of Anizy. During the French Revolution the castle was destroyed and Achery became an independent commune. During the First World War, the village was completely destroyed but was rebuilt after the war.

== Administration ==
List of Mayors of Achery

From	To	Name	Party
2001	2014	Georges Demoulin	DVD
2014	2020	Arnaud Bonnard	
2020	2026	Marc Legard	
2026	incumbent	Fabrice Gosset	

== Population ==
Historical population

Year	Pop.	±% p.a.
1793	689	—
1800	761	+1.43%
1806	754	−0.15%
1821	862	+0.90%
1831	1,046	+1.95%
1836	1,099	+0.99%
1841	1,125	+0.47%
1846	1,117	−0.14%
1851	1,088	−0.52%
1856	1,099	+0.20%
1861	1,074	−0.46%
1866	1,046	−0.53%
1872	924	−2.05%
1876	927	+0.08%
1881	895	−0.70%
1886	908	+0.29%
1891	809	−2.28%
1896	763	−1.16%
1901	671	−2.54%

Year	Pop.	±% p.a.
1906	687	+0.47%
1911	655	−0.95%
1921	451	−3.66%
1926	464	+0.57%
1931	449	−0.66%
1936	469	+0.88%
1946	520	+1.04%
1954	501	−0.46%
1962	508	+0.17%
1968	524	+0.52%
1975	508	−0.44%
1982	578	+1.86%
1990	564	−0.31%
1999	540	−0.48%
2007	539	−0.02%
2012	620	+2.84%
2017	598	−0.72%
2023	584	−0.39%

Source: EHESS and INSEE

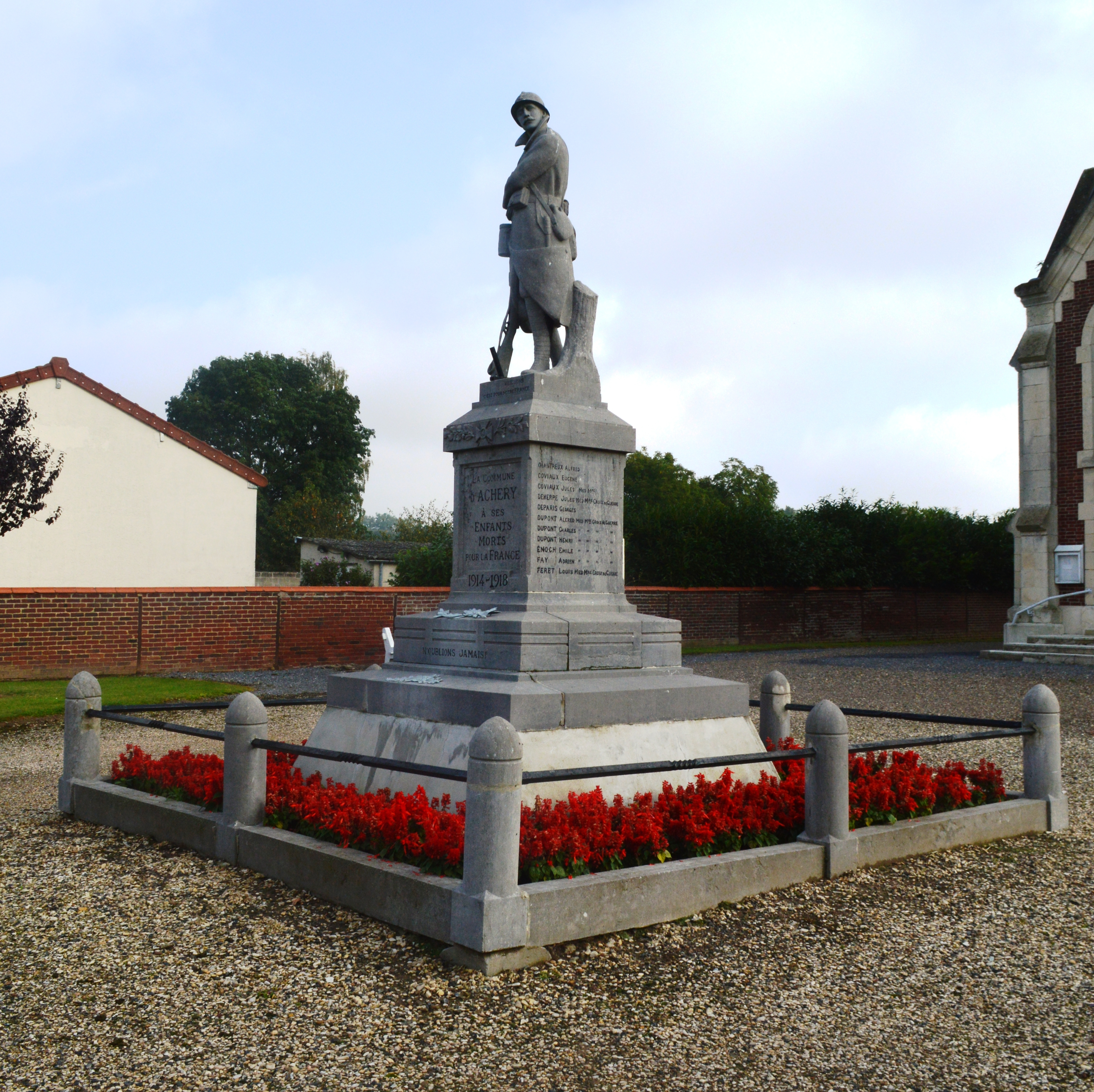
Achery War Memorial

== Events ==
- Flea market in May
- Festival on the third Sunday in June

== Sites and monuments ==
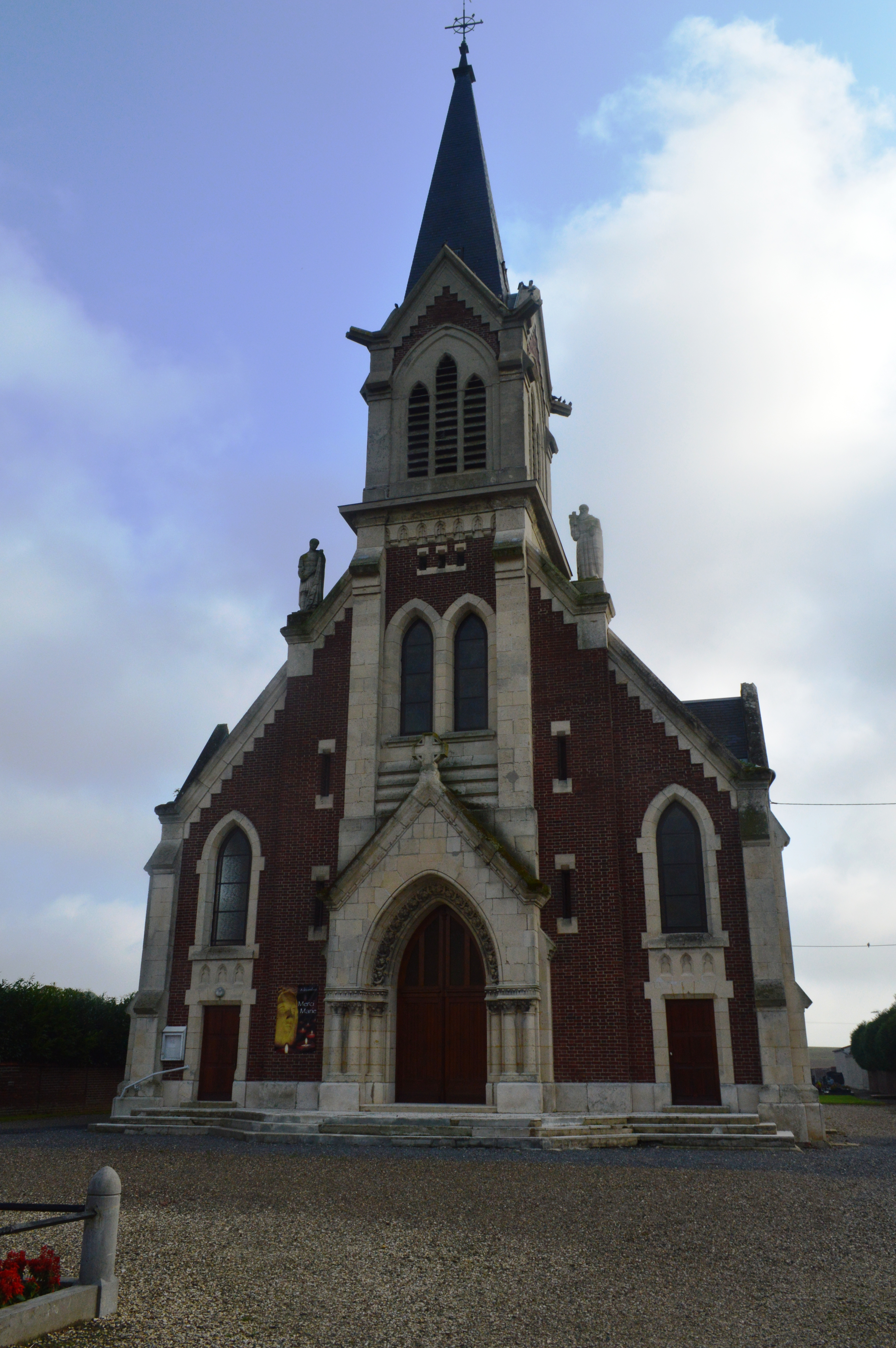
The Church of Saint Martin

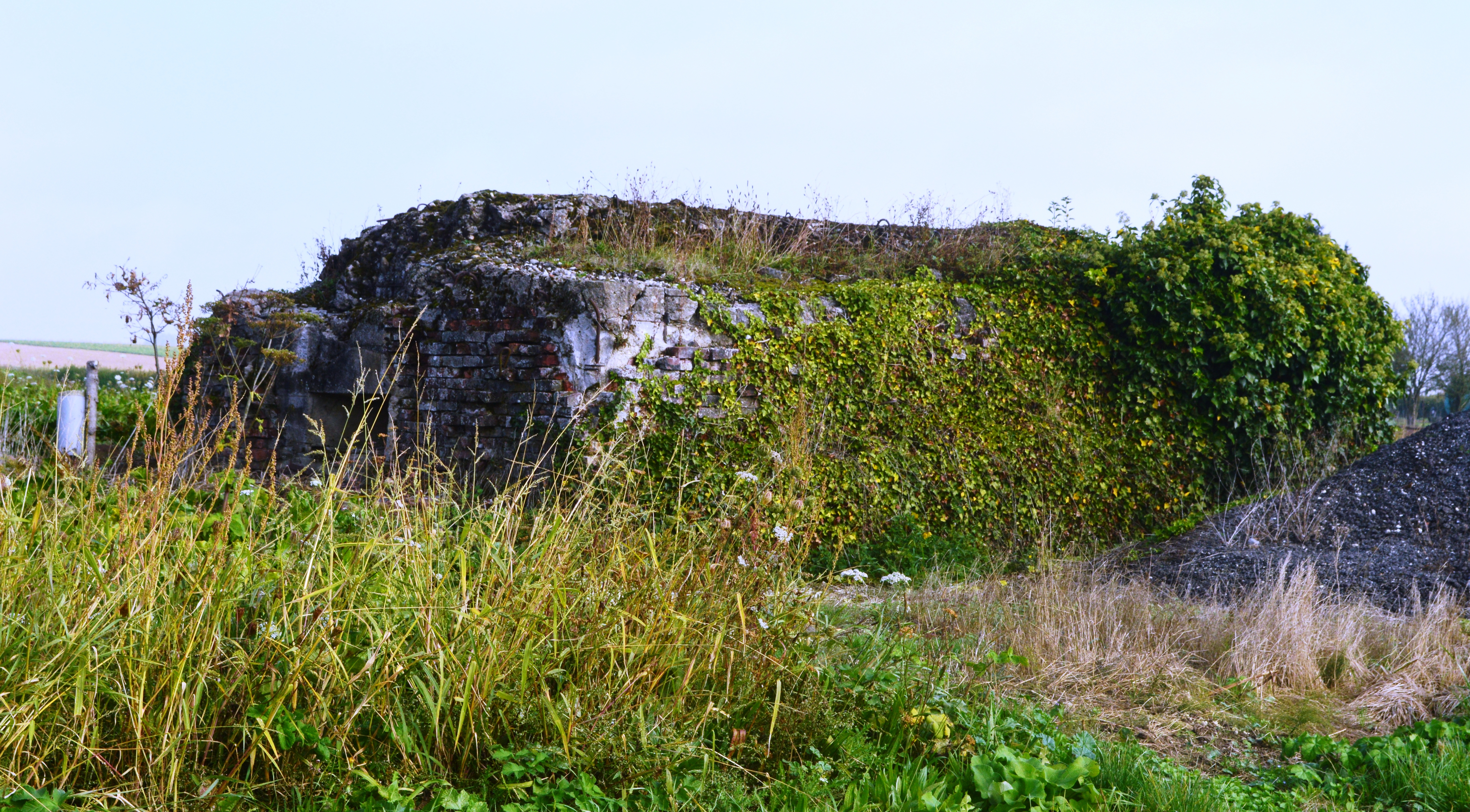
Old Blockhouse from the Hindenburg line

- The Church of Saint-Martin: rebuilt after the First World War
- An Old water mill
- The Dovecote Square
- Marshes and ponds
- Remains of many blockhouses of the Hindenburg Line

== See also ==
- Communes of the Aisne department
