= Achery =

Achery may refer to:

- Achery, Aisne, a commune in France
- Luc d'Achery (1609–1685), Maurist librarian and historian

== See also ==
- Archery
