= Robert Hoffstetter =

French taxonomist and herpetologist (1908–1999)

Robert Julien Hoffstetter (11 June 1908 in Fargniers – 29 December 1999 in Gennevilliers) was a French taxonomist and herpetologist who was influential in categorizing reptiles. He described the snake families Bolyeriidae and Madtsoiidae.

== Selected bibliography ==
- Faune du gisement précolombien d'Anse-Belleville: Reptiles, 1946
- Les mammifères pléistocènes de la république de l'Equateur, 1952
- Notice sur les titres et travaux scientifiques, 1955
- Contribution à l'étude des Orophodontoidea, gravigrades cuirassés de la Patagonie, 1956
- Le gisement de ternifine, 1963
- Historique et géologie, 1963
- Révision des Artiodactyles de l'Eocène moyen de Lissieu (Rhône), 1972
- Rongeurs caviomorphes de l'Oligocène de Bolivie, 1976
- Phylogenie et Paleobiogeographie, 1982
