= Liez =

Liez may refer to the following places in France:

- Liez, Aisne, a commune in the department of Aisne
- Liez, Vendée, a commune in the department of Vendée
