= Beautor =

- Commune
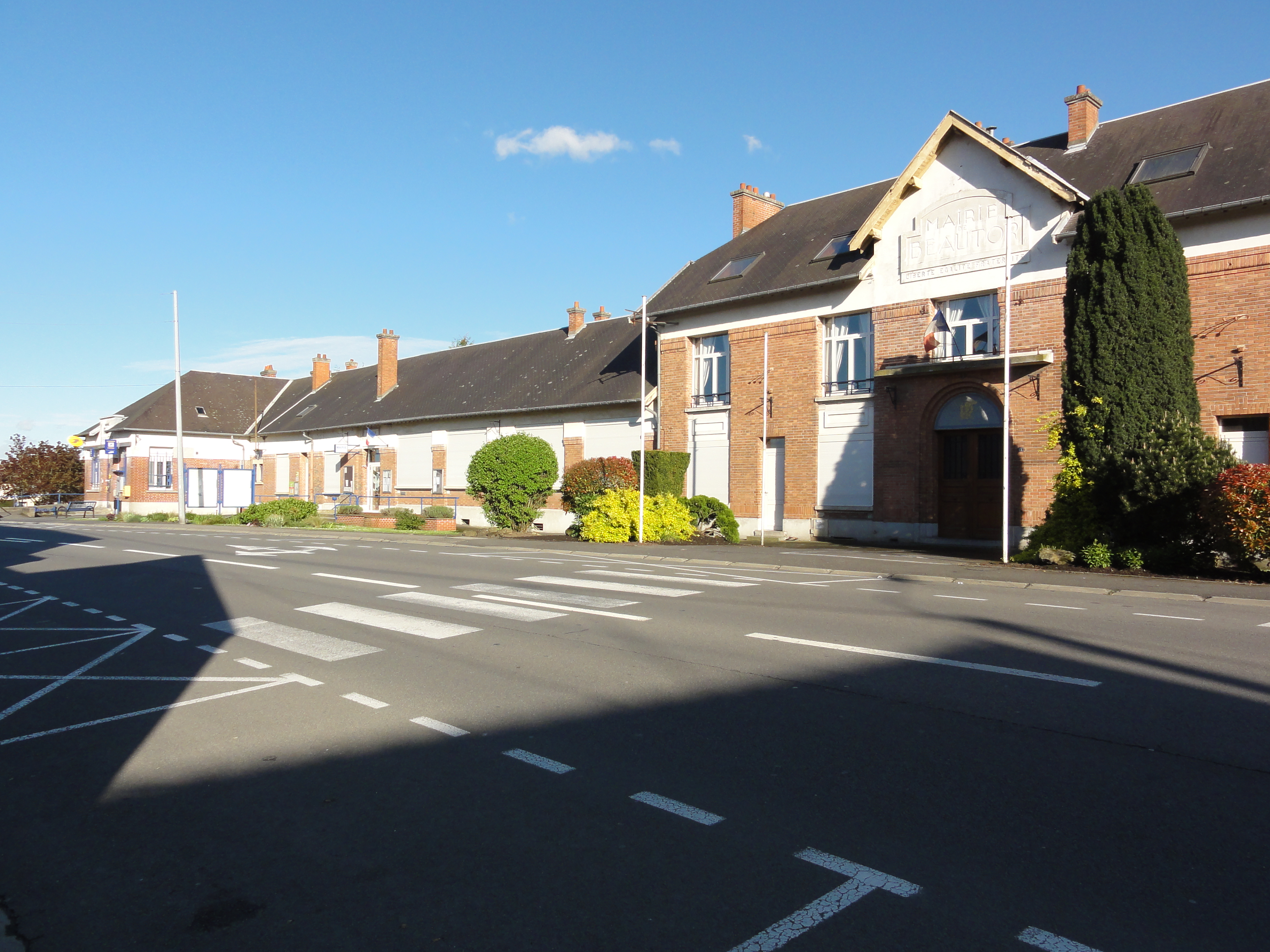
- Town hall and school
- Location of Beautor
- Location within France Location within Hauts-de-France
- Coordinates: 49°39′06″N 3°20′44″E
- Country: France
- Region: Hauts-de-France
- Department: Aisne
- Arrondissement: Laon
- Canton: Tergnier
- Intercommunality: CA Chauny Tergnier La Fère

Government
  - Mayor (2026–32): Jackie Goarin
- Area^{1}: 7.44 km^{2} (2.87 sq mi)
- Elevation: 50 m (160 ft)
- Highest elevation: 61 m (200 ft)
- Lowest elevation: 45 m (148 ft)
- Population (2023): 2,579
  - Density: 347/km^{2} (898/sq mi)
- Time zone: UTC+01:00 (CET)
  - Summer (DST): UTC+02:00 (CEST)
- INSEE/Postal code: 02059 /02800
- ^{1} French Land Register data, which excludes lakes, ponds, glaciers > 1 km^{2} (0.386 sq mi or 247 acres) and river estuaries.

Beautor (French pronunciation: [botɔʁ]) is a commune in the department of Aisne in Hauts-de-France in northern France.

== Population ==
Historical population
Year	Pop.	±% p.a.
1968	3,870	—
1975	3,595	−1.05%
1982	3,323	−1.12%
1990	3,114	−0.81%
1999	2,977	−0.50%
2007	2,679	−1.31%
2012	2,675	−0.03%
2017	2,699	+0.18%
2023	2,579	−0.76%
Source: INSEE

== See also ==
- Communes of the Aisne department
