= Communauté d'agglomération Chauny Tergnier La Fère =

Chauny Tergnier La Fère
- Communauté d'agglomération
- Interactive map of Chauny Tergnier La Fère
- Coordinates: 49°38′N 03°18′E
- Country: France
- Region: Hauts-de-France
- Department: Aisne
- No. of communes: {{{nbcomm}}}
- Established: 2017
- Area: 382.8 km^{2} (147.8 sq mi)
- Population (2019): 55,189
  - Density: 144.2/km^{2} (373.4/sq mi)
- Website: ctlf.fr

Communauté d'agglomération Chauny Tergnier La Fère is the communauté d'agglomération, an intercommunal structure, centred on the towns of Chauny, Tergnier and La Fère. It is located in the Aisne department, in the Hauts-de-France region, northern France. Created in 2017, its seat is in Chauny. Its area is 382.8 km^{2}. Its population was 55,189 in 2019.

== Composition ==
The communauté d'agglomération consists of the following 48 communes:

1. Abbécourt
2. Achery
3. Amigny-Rouy
4. Andelain
5. Anguilcourt-le-Sart
6. Autreville
7. Beaumont-en-Beine
8. Beautor
9. Bertaucourt-Epourdon
10. Béthancourt-en-Vaux
11. Bichancourt
12. Brie
13. Caillouël-Crépigny
14. Caumont
15. Charmes
16. Chauny
17. Commenchon
18. Condren
19. Courbes
20. Danizy
21. Deuillet
22. La Fère
23. Fourdrain
24. Fressancourt
25. Frières-Faillouël
26. Guivry
27. Liez
28. Manicamp
29. Marest-Dampcourt
30. Mayot
31. Mennessis
32. Monceau-lès-Leups
33. Neuflieux
34. La Neuville-en-Beine
35. Ognes
36. Pierremande
37. Quierzy
38. Rogécourt
39. Saint-Gobain
40. Saint-Nicolas-aux-Bois
41. Servais
42. Sinceny
43. Tergnier
44. Travecy
45. Ugny-le-Gay
46. Versigny
47. Villequier-Aumont
48. Viry-Noureuil
