= Mennessis =

- Commune
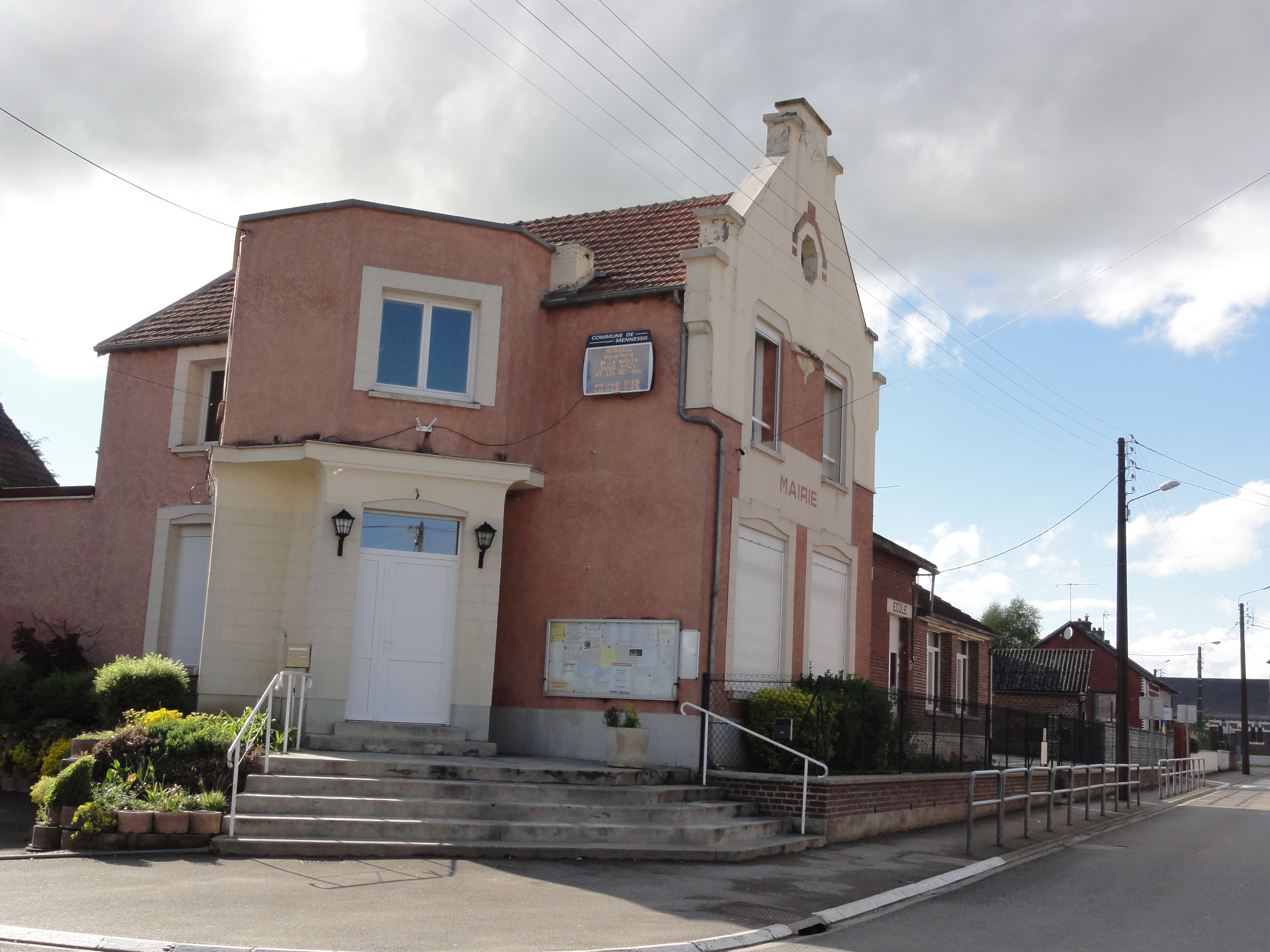
- The town hall of Mennessis
- Location of Mennessis
- Location within France Location within Hauts-de-France
- Coordinates: 49°41′41″N 3°16′25″E
- Country: France
- Region: Hauts-de-France
- Department: Aisne
- Arrondissement: Laon
- Canton: Tergnier
- Intercommunality: CA Chauny Tergnier La Fère

Government
  - Mayor (2026–32): Antoine De Abreu
- Area^{1}: 5.23 km^{2} (2.02 sq mi)
- Elevation: 70 m (230 ft)
- Highest elevation: 88 m (289 ft)
- Lowest elevation: 54 m (177 ft)
- Population (2023): 419
  - Density: 80.1/km^{2} (207/sq mi)
- Time zone: UTC+01:00 (CET)
  - Summer (DST): UTC+02:00 (CEST)
- INSEE/Postal code: 02474 /02700
- ^{1} French Land Register data, which excludes lakes, ponds, glaciers > 1 km^{2} (0.386 sq mi or 247 acres) and river estuaries.

Mennessis is a commune in the Aisne department in Hauts-de-France in northern France. Mennessis station has rail connections to Saint-Quentin, Amiens, Compiègne and Laon.

== Population ==
Historical population
Year	Pop.	±% p.a.
1968	403	—
1975	344	−2.24%
1982	381	+1.47%
1990	372	−0.30%
1999	346	−0.80%
2007	392	+1.57%
2012	422	+1.49%
2017	408	−0.67%
2023	419	+0.44%
Source: INSEE

== See also ==
- Communes of the Aisne department
