= Liez, Aisne =

Liez
- Commune
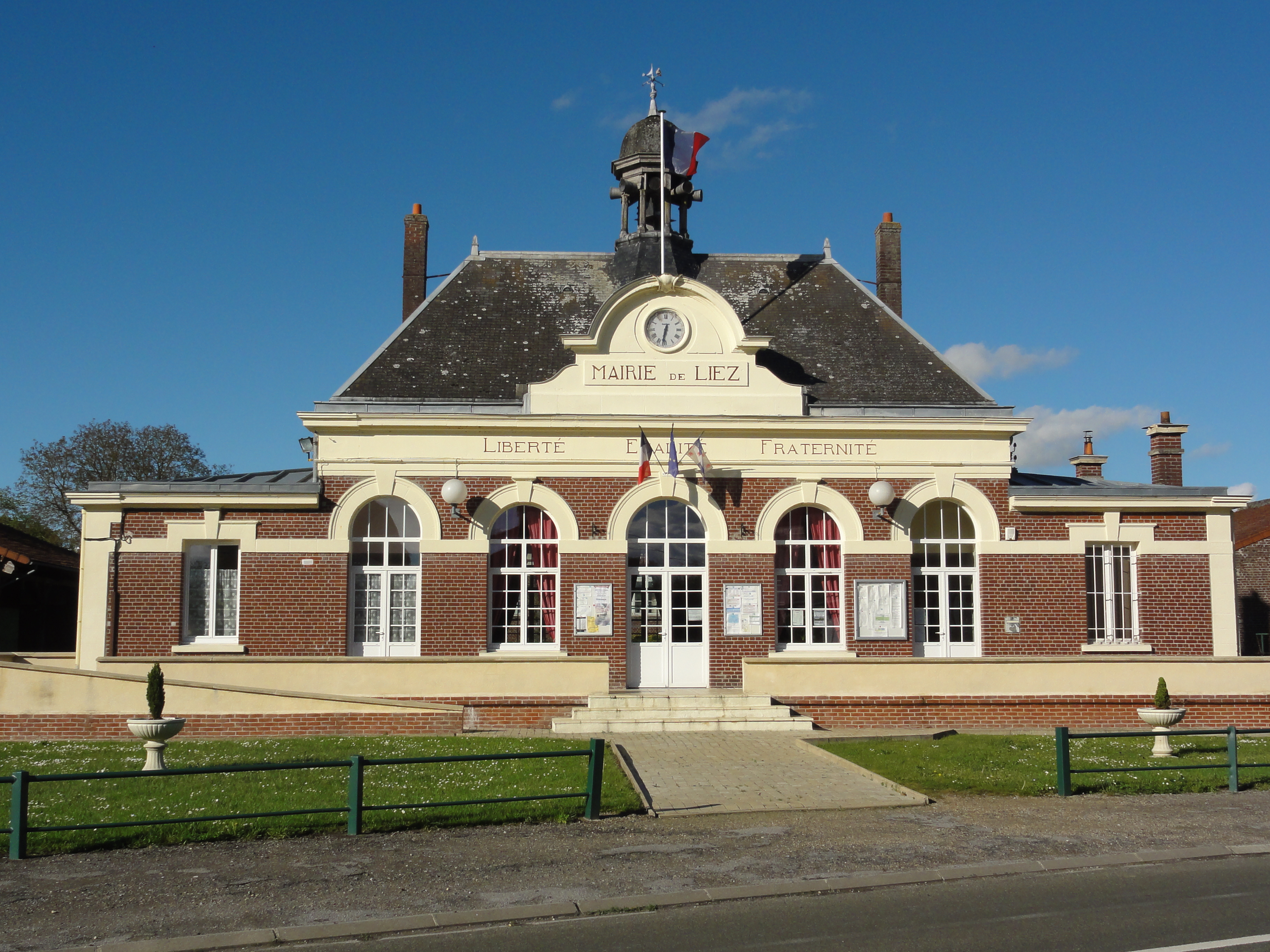
- The town hall of Liez

- Coat of arms
- Location of Liez
- Location within France Location within Hauts-de-France
- Coordinates: 49°41′29″N 3°17′30″E
- Country: France
- Region: Hauts-de-France
- Department: Aisne
- Arrondissement: Laon
- Canton: Tergnier
- Intercommunality: CA Chauny Tergnier La Fère

Government
  - Mayor (2026–32): François Dumange
- Area^{1}: 5.45 km^{2} (2.10 sq mi)
- Elevation: 58 m (190 ft)
- Highest elevation: 91 m (299 ft)
- Lowest elevation: 53 m (174 ft)
- Population (2023): 385
  - Density: 70.6/km^{2} (183/sq mi)
- Time zone: UTC+01:00 (CET)
  - Summer (DST): UTC+02:00 (CEST)
- INSEE/Postal code: 02431 /02700
- ^{1} French Land Register data, which excludes lakes, ponds, glaciers > 1 km^{2} (0.386 sq mi or 247 acres) and river estuaries.

Liez (French pronunciation: [lje]) is a commune in the Aisne department in Hauts-de-France in northern France.

== Population ==
Historical population
Year	Pop.	±% p.a.
1968	398	—
1975	353	−1.70%
1982	480	+4.49%
1990	492	+0.31%
1999	443	−1.16%
2007	449	+0.17%
2012	421	−1.28%
2017	391	−1.47%
2023	385	−0.26%
Source: INSEE

== See also ==
- Communes of the Aisne department
