= Monceau-lès-Leups =

- Commune
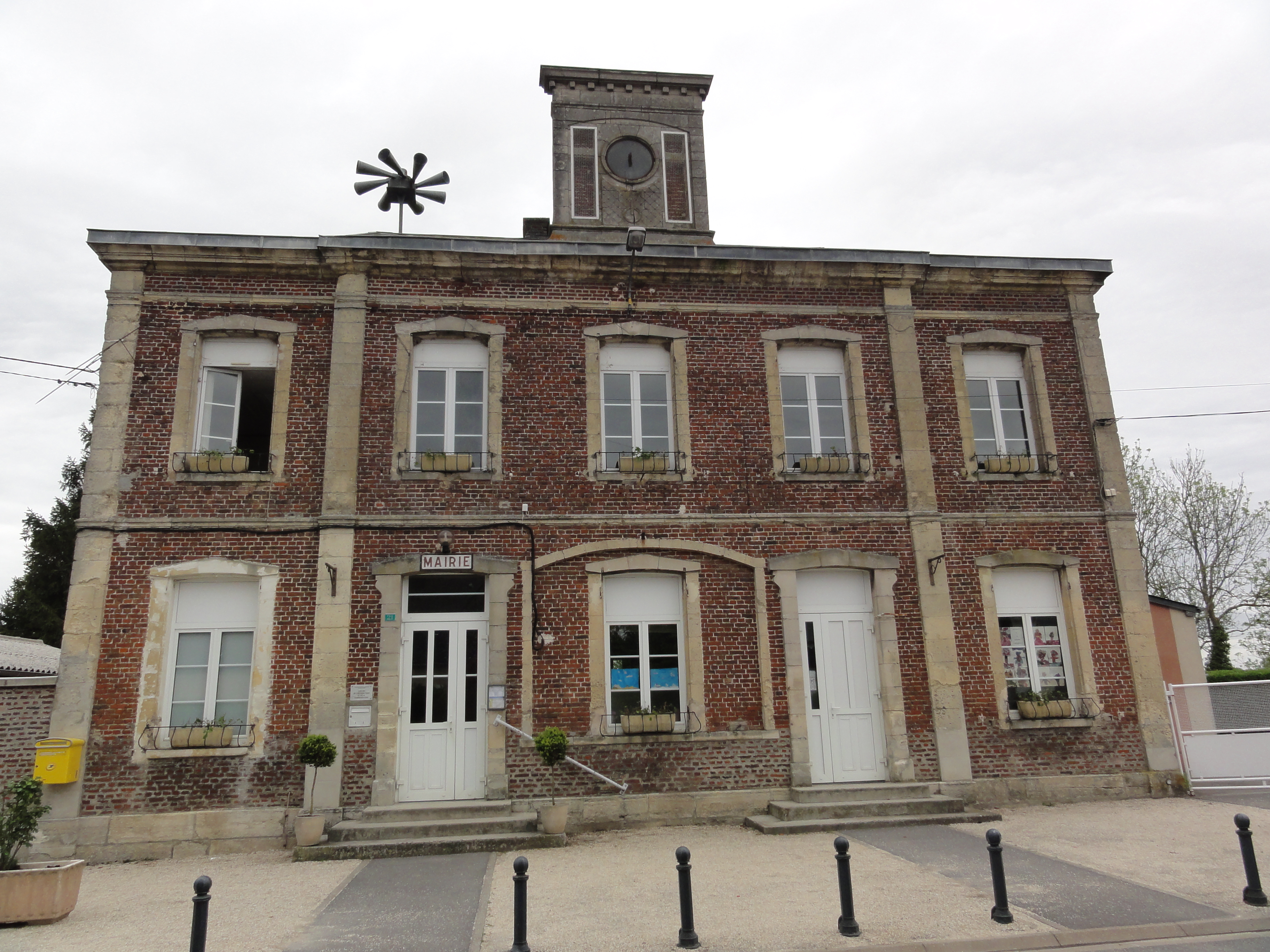
- The town hall and school of Monceau-lès-Leups
- Location of Monceau-lès-Leups
- Location within France Location within Hauts-de-France
- Coordinates: 49°40′17″N 3°29′33″E
- Country: France
- Region: Hauts-de-France
- Department: Aisne
- Arrondissement: Laon
- Canton: Tergnier
- Intercommunality: CA Chauny Tergnier La Fère

Government
  - Mayor (2026–32): Jean-Jacques Pierront
- Area^{1}: 13.3 km^{2} (5.1 sq mi)
- Highest elevation: 112 m (367 ft)
- Lowest elevation: 59 m (194 ft)
- Population (2023): 426
  - Density: 32.0/km^{2} (83.0/sq mi)
- Time zone: UTC+01:00 (CET)
  - Summer (DST): UTC+02:00 (CEST)
- INSEE/Postal code: 02492 /02270
- ^{1} French Land Register data, which excludes lakes, ponds, glaciers > 1 km^{2} (0.386 sq mi or 247 acres) and river estuaries.

Monceau-lès-Leups (French pronunciation: [mɔ̃so lɛ lø]) is a commune in the Aisne department in Hauts-de-France in northern France.

== Population ==
Historical population
Year	Pop.	±% p.a.
1968	444	—
1975	412	−1.06%
1982	389	−0.82%
1990	367	−0.73%
1999	426	+1.67%
2007	470	+1.24%
2012	465	−0.21%
2017	473	+0.34%
2023	426	−1.73%
Source: INSEE

== See also ==
- Communes of the Aisne department
