= Canton of Tergnier =

Coordinates: 49°39′21″N 3°17′30″E

Tergnier
- Canton
- Interactive map of Tergnier
- Country: France
- Region: Hauts-de-France
- Department: Aisne
- No. of communes: {{{nbcomm}}}
- Area: 190.59 km^{2} (73.59 sq mi)
- Population (2023): 28,505
  - Density: 149.56/km^{2} (387.36/sq mi)
- INSEE code: 02 18

The canton of Tergnier is an administrative division in northern France. At the French canton reorganisation which came into effect in March 2015, the canton was expanded from 4 to 24 communes:

1. Achery
2. Andelain
3. Anguilcourt-le-Sart
4. Beautor
5. Bertaucourt-Epourdon
6. Brie
7. Charmes
8. Courbes
9. Danizy
10. Deuillet
11. La Fère
12. Fourdrain
13. Fressancourt
14. Liez
15. Mayot
16. Mennessis
17. Monceau-lès-Leups
18. Rogécourt
19. Saint-Gobain
20. Saint-Nicolas-aux-Bois
21. Servais
22. Tergnier
23. Travecy
24. Versigny

== Demographics ==
Historical population
Year	Pop.	±% p.a.
2013	29,921	—
2018	29,445	−0.32%
Source: INSEE

== See also ==
- Cantons of the Aisne department
- Communes of France
