= Saint-Nicolas-aux-Bois =

- Commune
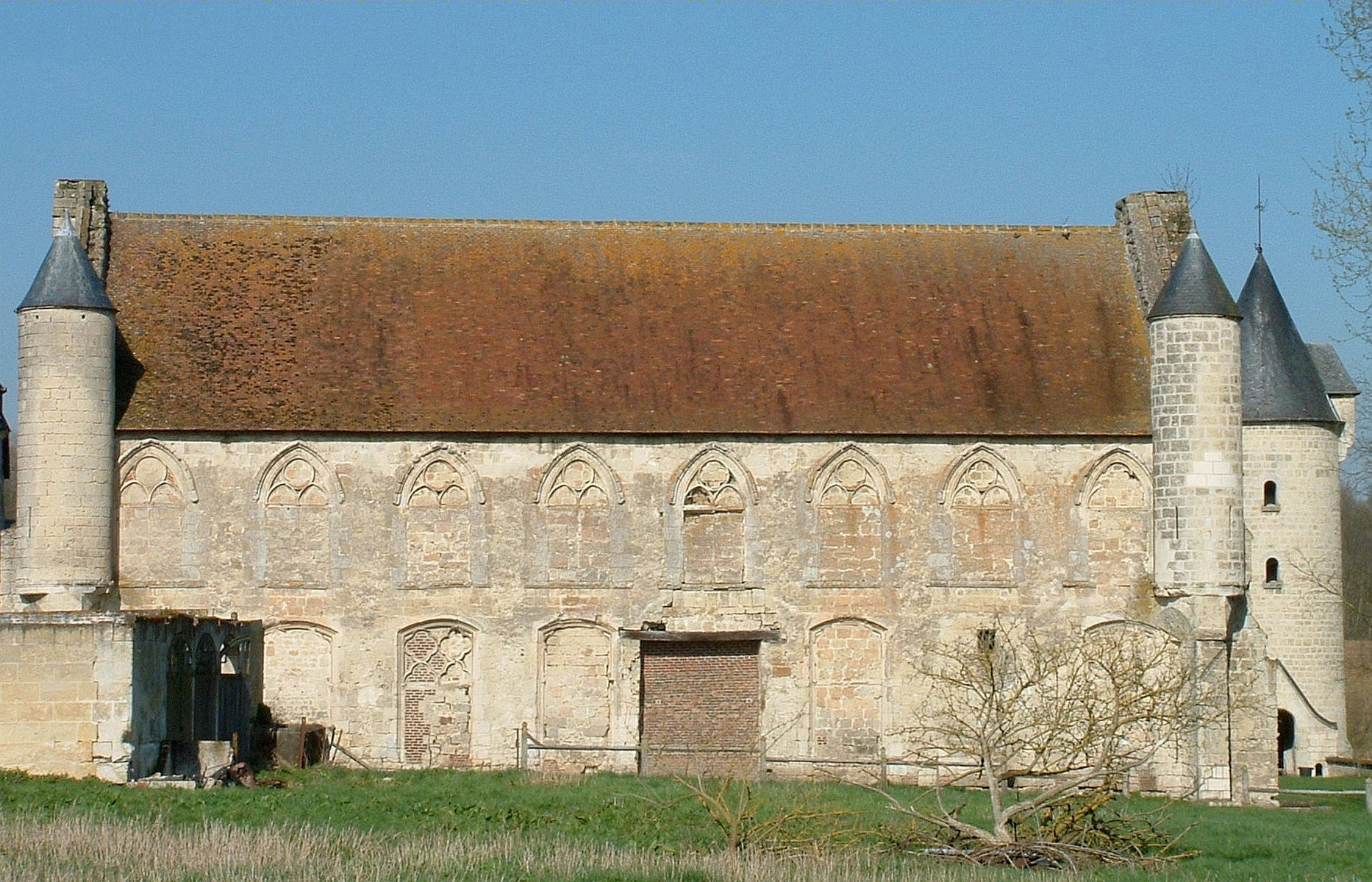
- The old priory of Le Tortoir
- Location of Saint-Nicolas-aux-Bois
- Location within France Location within Hauts-de-France
- Coordinates: 49°35′36″N 3°25′55″E
- Country: France
- Region: Hauts-de-France
- Department: Aisne
- Arrondissement: Laon
- Canton: Tergnier
- Intercommunality: CA Chauny Tergnier La Fère

Government
  - Mayor (2026–32): Jean-Claude Debonne
- Area^{1}: 6.64 km^{2} (2.56 sq mi)
- Elevation: 90 m (300 ft)
- Highest elevation: 193 m (633 ft)
- Lowest elevation: 64 m (210 ft)
- Population (2023): 110
  - Density: 17/km^{2} (43/sq mi)
- Time zone: UTC+01:00 (CET)
  - Summer (DST): UTC+02:00 (CEST)
- INSEE/Postal code: 02685 /02410
- ^{1} French Land Register data, which excludes lakes, ponds, glaciers > 1 km^{2} (0.386 sq mi or 247 acres) and river estuaries.

Saint-Nicolas-aux-Bois (French pronunciation: [sɛ̃ nikɔla o bwa]) is a commune in the Aisne department in Hauts-de-France in northern France.

== Population ==
Historical population
Year	Pop.	±% p.a.
1968	109	—
1975	93	−2.24%
1982	107	+2.02%
1990	111	+0.46%
1999	93	−1.95%
2007	105	+1.53%
2012	113	+1.48%
2017	119	+1.04%
2023	110	−1.30%
Source: INSEE

== See also ==
- Communes of the Aisne department
