= La Fère =

- Commune
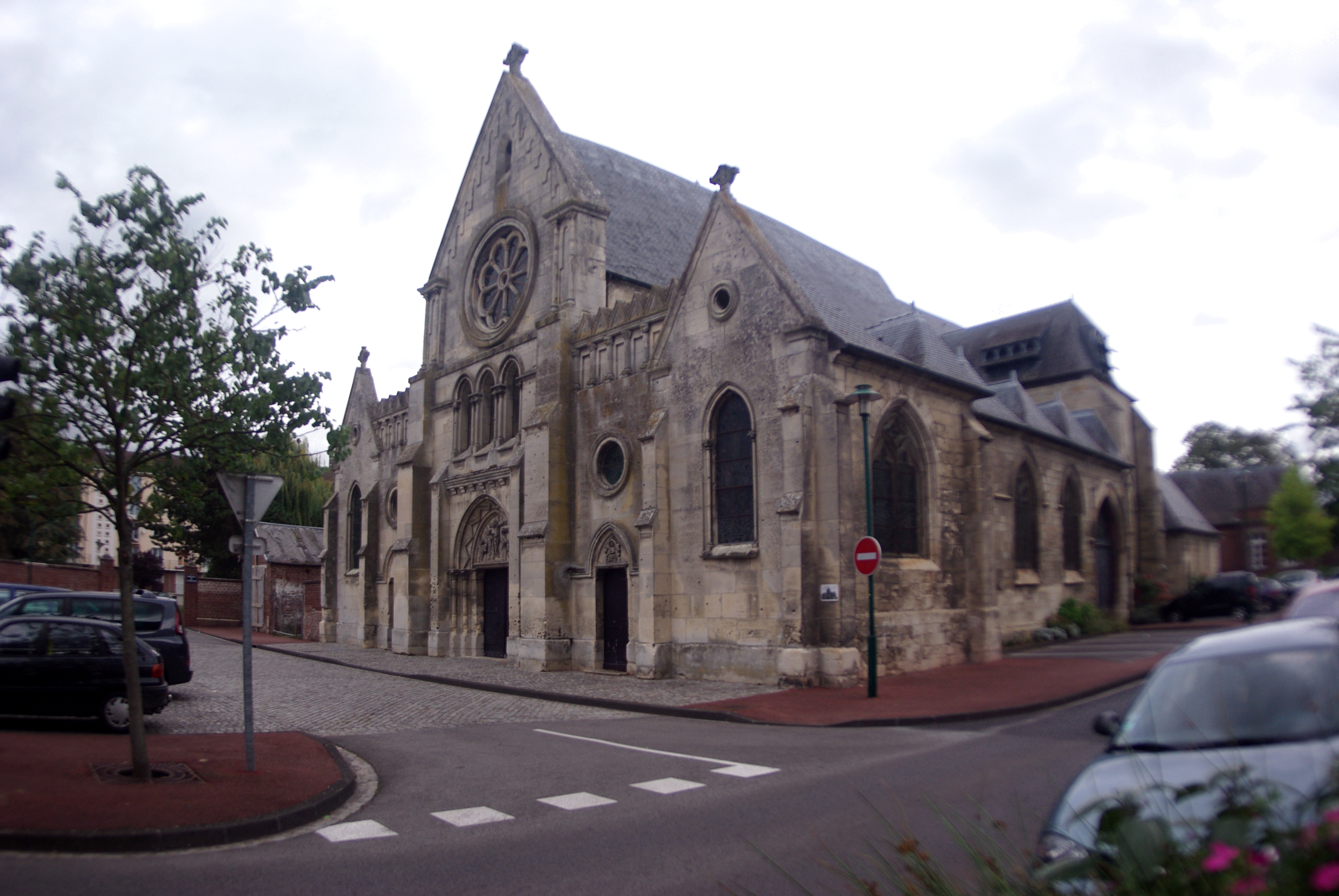
- The church of La Fère

- Coat of arms
- Location of La Fère
- Location within France Location within Hauts-de-France
- Coordinates: 49°39′45″N 3°21′59″E
- Country: France
- Region: Hauts-de-France
- Department: Aisne
- Arrondissement: Laon
- Canton: Tergnier
- Intercommunality: CA Chauny Tergnier La Fère

Government
  - Mayor (2026–32): Francine Boulard
- Area^{1}: 6.73 km^{2} (2.60 sq mi)
- Elevation: 50 m (160 ft)
- Highest elevation: 80 m (260 ft)
- Lowest elevation: 47 m (154 ft)
- Population (2023): 2,796
  - Density: 415/km^{2} (1,080/sq mi)
- Time zone: UTC+01:00 (CET)
  - Summer (DST): UTC+02:00 (CEST)
- INSEE/Postal code: 02304 /02800
- ^{1} French Land Register data, which excludes lakes, ponds, glaciers > 1 km^{2} (0.386 sq mi or 247 acres) and river estuaries.

La Fère (French pronunciation: [la fɛʁ]) is a commune in the Aisne department in Hauts-de-France in France. It was once famous for its military school (1720), one of the oldest commissioned for instructing ordnance officers.

== History ==
During World War II, Nazi Germany operated the Stalag 191 prisoner-of-war camp for Allied POWs in La Fère.

== Population ==
Historical population

Year	Pop.	±% p.a.
1793	2,483	—
1800	2,600	+0.66%
1806	2,721	+0.76%
1821	2,678	−0.11%
1831	2,792	+0.42%
1836	2,651	−1.03%
1841	3,911	+8.09%
1846	4,632	+3.44%
1851	4,441	−0.84%
1856	4,122	−1.48%
1861	4,061	−0.30%
1866	4,984	+4.18%
1872	4,158	−2.97%
1876	4,914	+4.26%
1881	5,109	+0.78%
1886	4,951	−0.63%
1891	5,394	+1.73%
1896	5,011	−1.46%
1901	4,982	−0.12%

Year	Pop.	±% p.a.
1906	4,745	−0.97%
1911	5,095	+1.43%
1921	2,136	−8.33%
1926	3,161	+8.15%
1931	3,331	+1.05%
1936	3,533	+1.18%
1946	2,750	−2.47%
1954	3,485	+3.01%
1962	3,161	−1.21%
1968	3,703	+2.67%
1975	3,531	−0.68%
1982	2,979	−2.40%
1990	2,930	−0.21%
1999	2,817	−0.44%
2007	2,962	+0.63%
2012	2,982	+0.13%
2017	2,859	−0.84%
2023	2,796	−0.37%

Source: EHESS and INSEE (1968-2023)

== See also ==
- Communes of the Aisne department
