= Bertaucourt-Epourdon =

- Commune
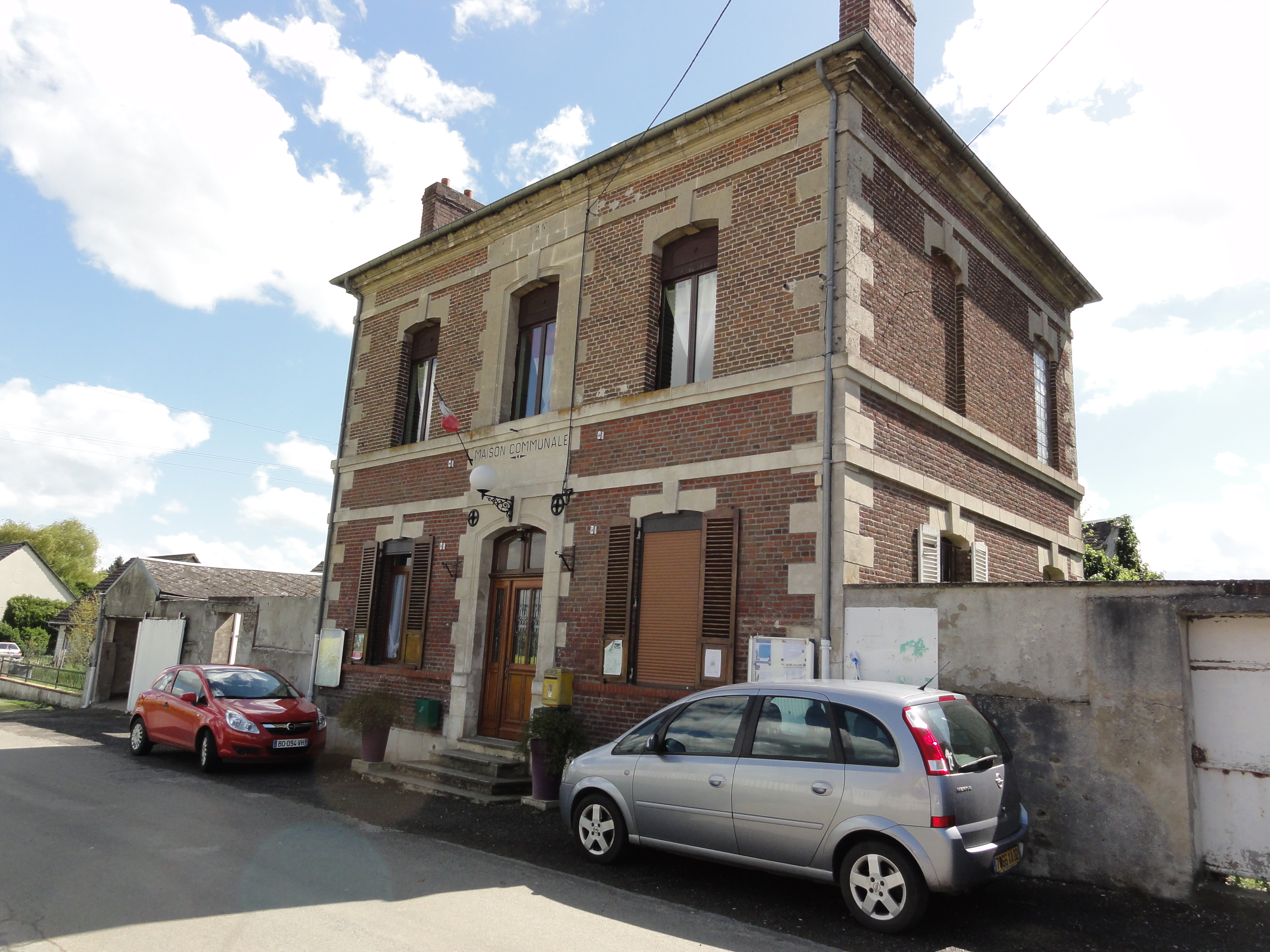
- Town hall
- Location of Bertaucourt-Epourdon
- Location within France Location within Hauts-de-France
- Coordinates: 49°37′39″N 3°23′20″E
- Country: France
- Region: Hauts-de-France
- Department: Aisne
- Arrondissement: Laon
- Canton: Tergnier
- Intercommunality: CA Chauny Tergnier La Fère

Government
  - Mayor (2026–32): Henri-Michel Moreau
- Area^{1}: 7.46 km^{2} (2.88 sq mi)
- Elevation: 99 m (325 ft)
- Highest elevation: 121 m (397 ft)
- Lowest elevation: 57 m (187 ft)
- Population (2023): 601
  - Density: 80.6/km^{2} (209/sq mi)
- Time zone: UTC+01:00 (CET)
  - Summer (DST): UTC+02:00 (CEST)
- INSEE/Postal code: 02074 /02800
- ^{1} French Land Register data, which excludes lakes, ponds, glaciers > 1 km^{2} (0.386 sq mi or 247 acres) and river estuaries.

Bertaucourt-Epourdon is a commune in the department of Aisne in Hauts-de-France in northern France.

== Population ==
Historical population
Year	Pop.	±% p.a.
1968	482	—
1975	418	−2.01%
1982	489	+2.27%
1990	462	−0.71%
1999	515	+1.21%
2007	565	+1.16%
2012	612	+1.61%
2017	604	−0.26%
2023	601	−0.08%
Source: INSEE

== See also ==
- Communes of the Aisne department
