= Versigny, Aisne =

Versigny
- Commune
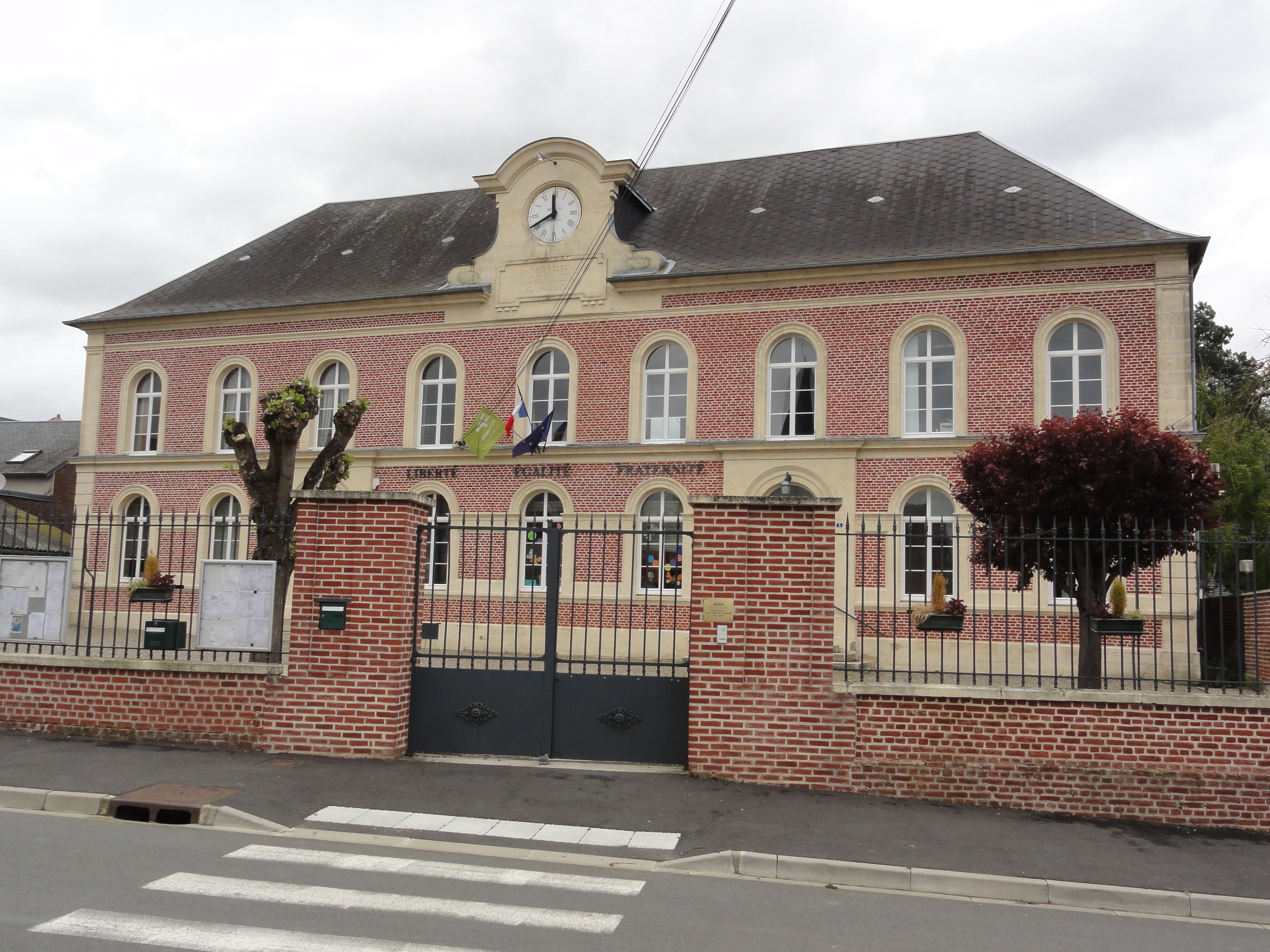
- The town hall and school of Versigny
- Location of Versigny
- Location within France Location within Hauts-de-France
- Coordinates: 49°39′12″N 3°26′10″E
- Country: France
- Region: Hauts-de-France
- Department: Aisne
- Arrondissement: Laon
- Canton: Tergnier
- Intercommunality: CA Chauny Tergnier La Fère

Government
  - Mayor (2026–32): Nathalie Jonneau
- Area^{1}: 12.89 km^{2} (4.98 sq mi)
- Elevation: 58 m (190 ft)
- Highest elevation: 87 m (285 ft)
- Lowest elevation: 51 m (167 ft)
- Population (2023): 470
  - Density: 36/km^{2} (94/sq mi)
- Time zone: UTC+01:00 (CET)
  - Summer (DST): UTC+02:00 (CEST)
- INSEE/Postal code: 02788 /02800
- ^{1} French Land Register data, which excludes lakes, ponds, glaciers > 1 km^{2} (0.386 sq mi or 247 acres) and river estuaries.

Versigny (French pronunciation: [vɛʁsiɲi]) is a commune in the Aisne department in Hauts-de-France in northern France. It is a member of the Communauté de communes des Villes d'Oyse. It is situated between Saint-Quentin, Laon and Chauny.

== Population ==
Historical population

Year	Pop.	±% p.a.
1793	402	—
1821	590	+1.38%
1846	750	+0.96%
1872	715	−0.18%
1901	654	−0.31%
1926	522	−0.90%
1946	541	+0.18%
1962	543	+0.02%
1968	500	−1.37%

Year	Pop.	±% p.a.
1975	447	−1.59%
1982	459	+0.38%
1990	485	+0.69%
1999	431	−1.30%
2007	454	+0.65%
2012	472	+0.78%
2017	468	−0.17%
2023	470	+0.07%

Source: EHESS and INSEE

== See also ==
- Communes of the Aisne department
