= Courbes =

- Commune
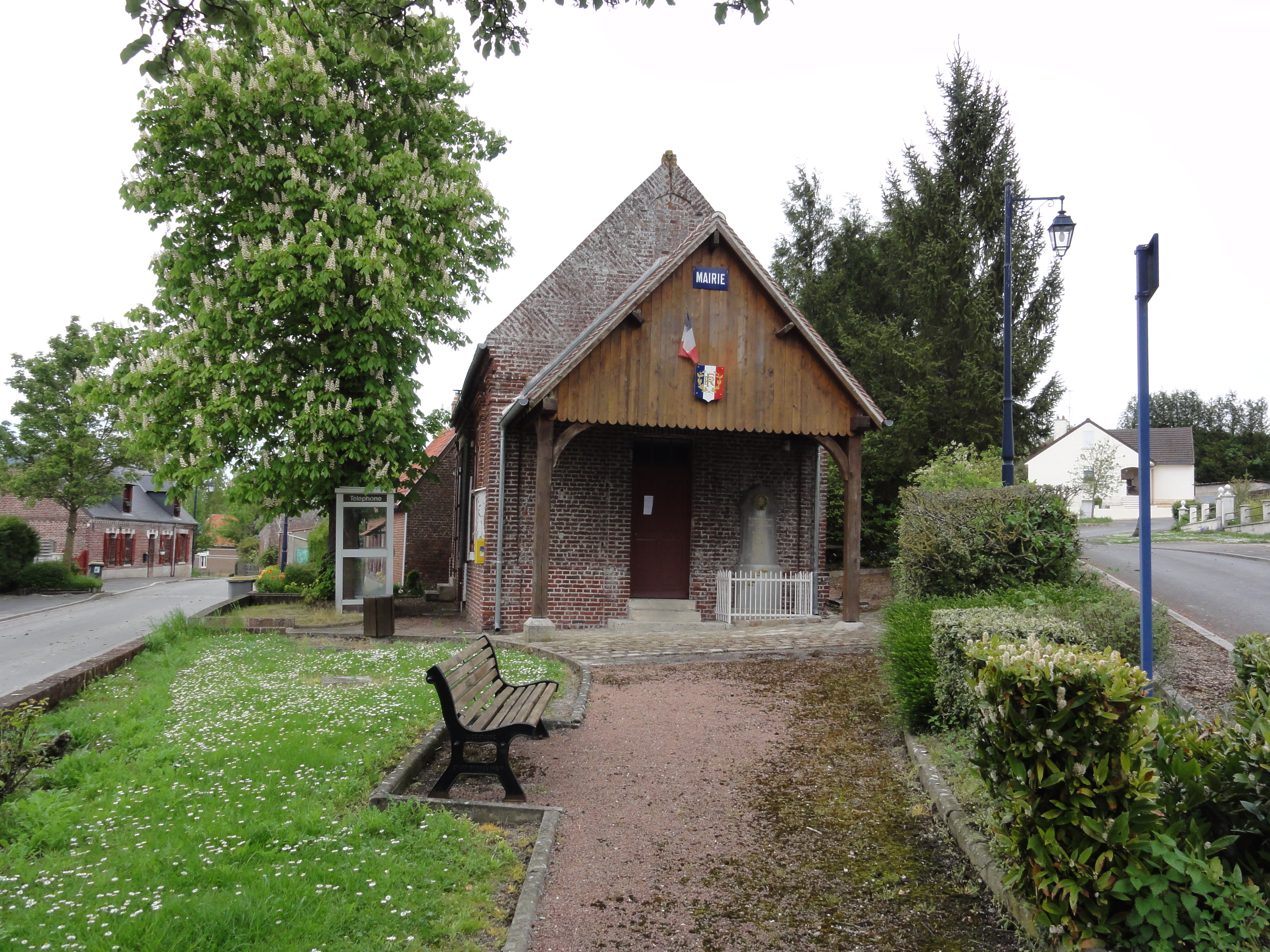
- The town hall of Courbes
- Location of Courbes
- Location within France Location within Hauts-de-France
- Coordinates: 49°41′07″N 3°27′07″E
- Country: France
- Region: Hauts-de-France
- Department: Aisne
- Arrondissement: Laon
- Canton: Tergnier
- Intercommunality: CA Chauny Tergnier La Fère

Government
  - Mayor (2026–32): Monique Laval
- Area^{1}: 3.16 km^{2} (1.22 sq mi)
- Elevation: 92 m (302 ft)
- Highest elevation: 83 m (272 ft)
- Lowest elevation: 52 m (171 ft)
- Population (2023): 39
  - Density: 12/km^{2} (32/sq mi)
- Time zone: UTC+01:00 (CET)
  - Summer (DST): UTC+02:00 (CEST)
- INSEE/Postal code: 02222 /02800
- ^{1} French Land Register data, which excludes lakes, ponds, glaciers > 1 km^{2} (0.386 sq mi or 247 acres) and river estuaries.

Courbes (French pronunciation: [kuʁb]) is a commune in the Aisne department in Hauts-de-France in northern France.

== Population ==
Historical population
| Year | Pop. | ±% p.a. |
|---|---|---|
| 1968 | 42 | — |
| 1975 | 33 | −3.39% |
| 1982 | 33 | +0.00% |
| 1990 | 40 | +2.43% |
| 1999 | 31 | −2.79% |
| 2007 | 35 | +1.53% |
| 2012 | 33 | −1.17% |
| 2017 | 31 | −1.24% |
| 2023 | 39 | +3.90% |
Source: INSEE

== See also ==
- Communes of the Aisne department
