= Fourdrain =

- Commune
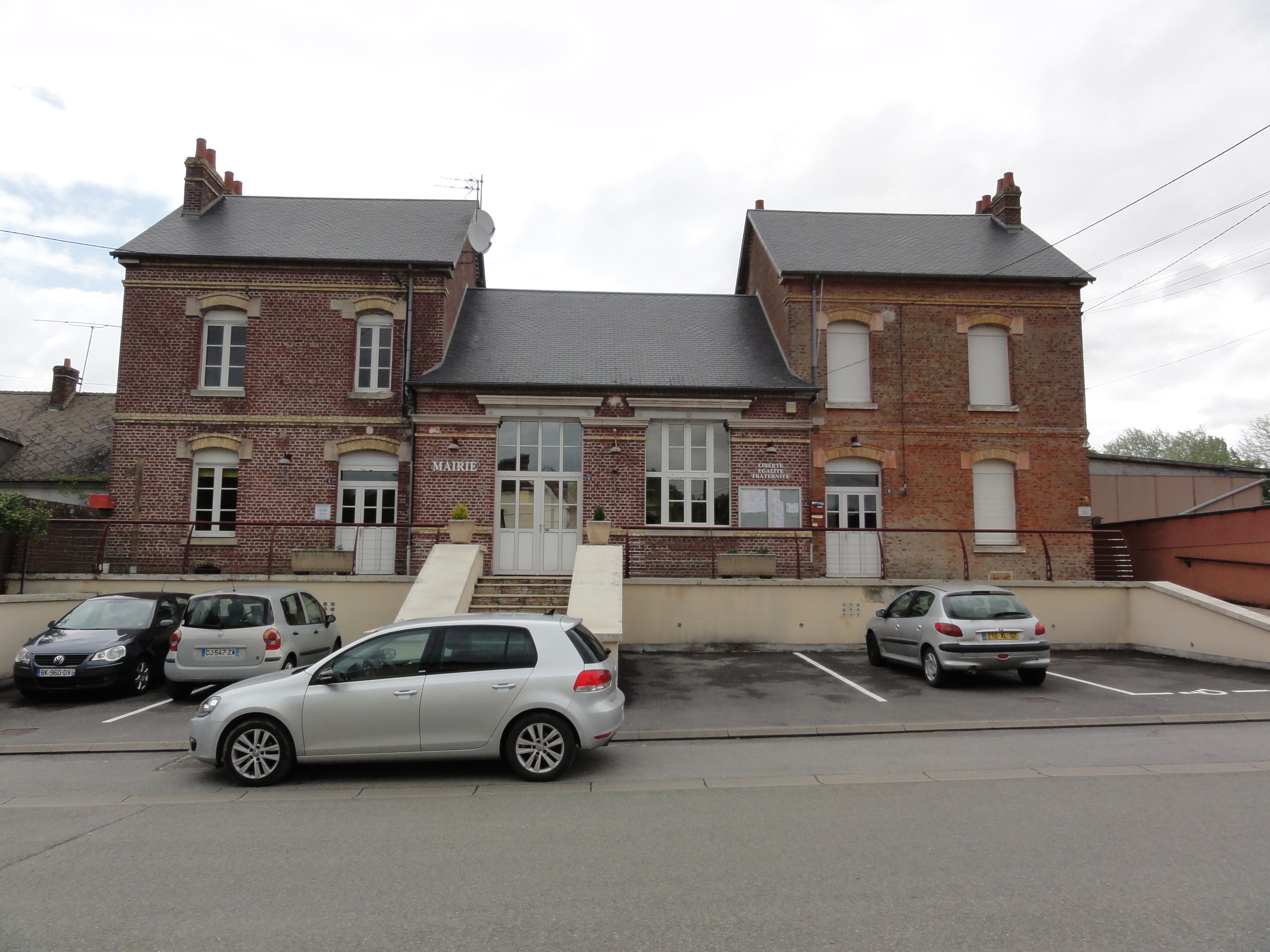
- The town hall and school of Fourdrain
- Location of Fourdrain
- Location within France Location within Hauts-de-France
- Coordinates: 49°36′41″N 3°28′21″E
- Country: France
- Region: Hauts-de-France
- Department: Aisne
- Arrondissement: Laon
- Canton: Tergnier
- Intercommunality: CA Chauny Tergnier La Fère

Government
  - Mayor (2026–32): Gilles Deseuste
- Area^{1}: 9.45 km^{2} (3.65 sq mi)
- Elevation: 93 m (305 ft)
- Highest elevation: 181 m (594 ft)
- Lowest elevation: 57 m (187 ft)
- Population (2023): 404
  - Density: 42.8/km^{2} (111/sq mi)
- Time zone: UTC+01:00 (CET)
  - Summer (DST): UTC+02:00 (CEST)
- INSEE/Postal code: 02329 /02870
- ^{1} French Land Register data, which excludes lakes, ponds, glaciers > 1 km^{2} (0.386 sq mi or 247 acres) and river estuaries.

Fourdrain (French pronunciation: [fuʁdʁɛ̃]) is a commune in the Aisne department in Hauts-de-France in northern France.

== Population ==
Historical population
Year	Pop.	±% p.a.
1968	433	—
1975	393	−1.38%
1982	404	+0.40%
1990	390	−0.44%
1999	433	+1.17%
2007	414	−0.56%
2012	413	−0.05%
2017	419	+0.29%
2023	404	−0.61%
Source: INSEE

== See also ==
- Communes of the Aisne department
