= Fressancourt =

- Commune
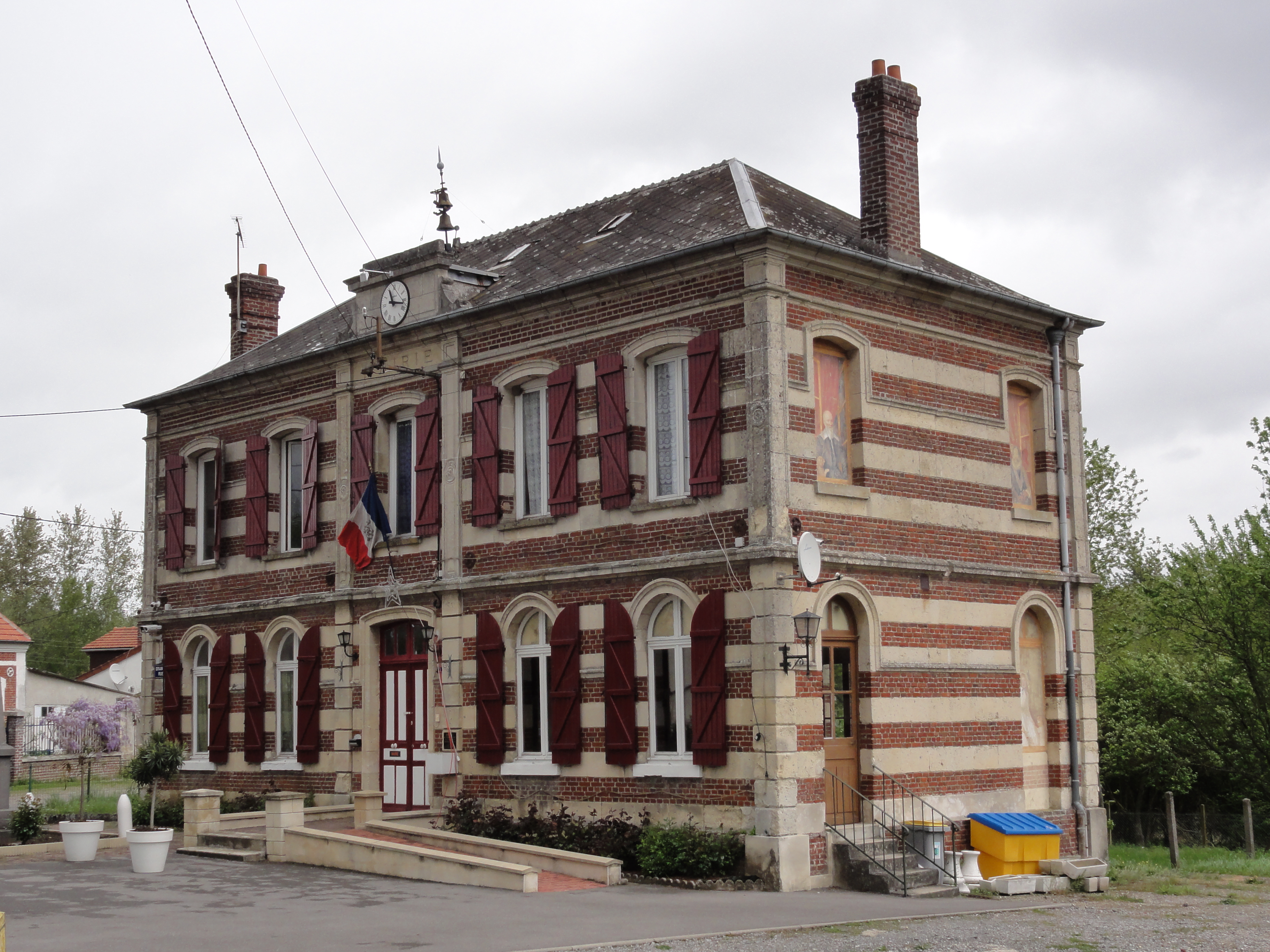
- The town hall of Fressancourt
- Location of Fressancourt
- Location within France Location within Hauts-de-France
- Coordinates: 49°38′00″N 3°25′35″E
- Country: France
- Region: Hauts-de-France
- Department: Aisne
- Arrondissement: Laon
- Canton: Tergnier
- Intercommunality: CA Chauny Tergnier La Fère

Government
  - Mayor (2026–32): Gaëtan Verroust
- Area^{1}: 2.51 km^{2} (0.97 sq mi)
- Elevation: 68 m (223 ft)
- Highest elevation: 113 m (371 ft)
- Lowest elevation: 57 m (187 ft)
- Population (2023): 166
  - Density: 66.1/km^{2} (171/sq mi)
- Time zone: UTC+01:00 (CET)
  - Summer (DST): UTC+02:00 (CEST)
- INSEE/Postal code: 02335 /02800
- ^{1} French Land Register data, which excludes lakes, ponds, glaciers > 1 km^{2} (0.386 sq mi or 247 acres) and river estuaries.

Fressancourt (French pronunciation: [fʁɛsɑ̃kuʁ]) is a commune in the Aisne department in Hauts-de-France in northern France.

== Population ==
Historical population
Year	Pop.	±% p.a.
1968	167	—
1975	134	−3.10%
1982	138	+0.42%
1990	163	+2.10%
1999	184	+1.36%
2007	224	+2.49%
2012	206	−1.66%
2017	192	−1.40%
2023	166	−2.40%
Source: INSEE

== See also ==
- Communes of the Aisne department
