= Brie, Aisne =

Brie
- Commune
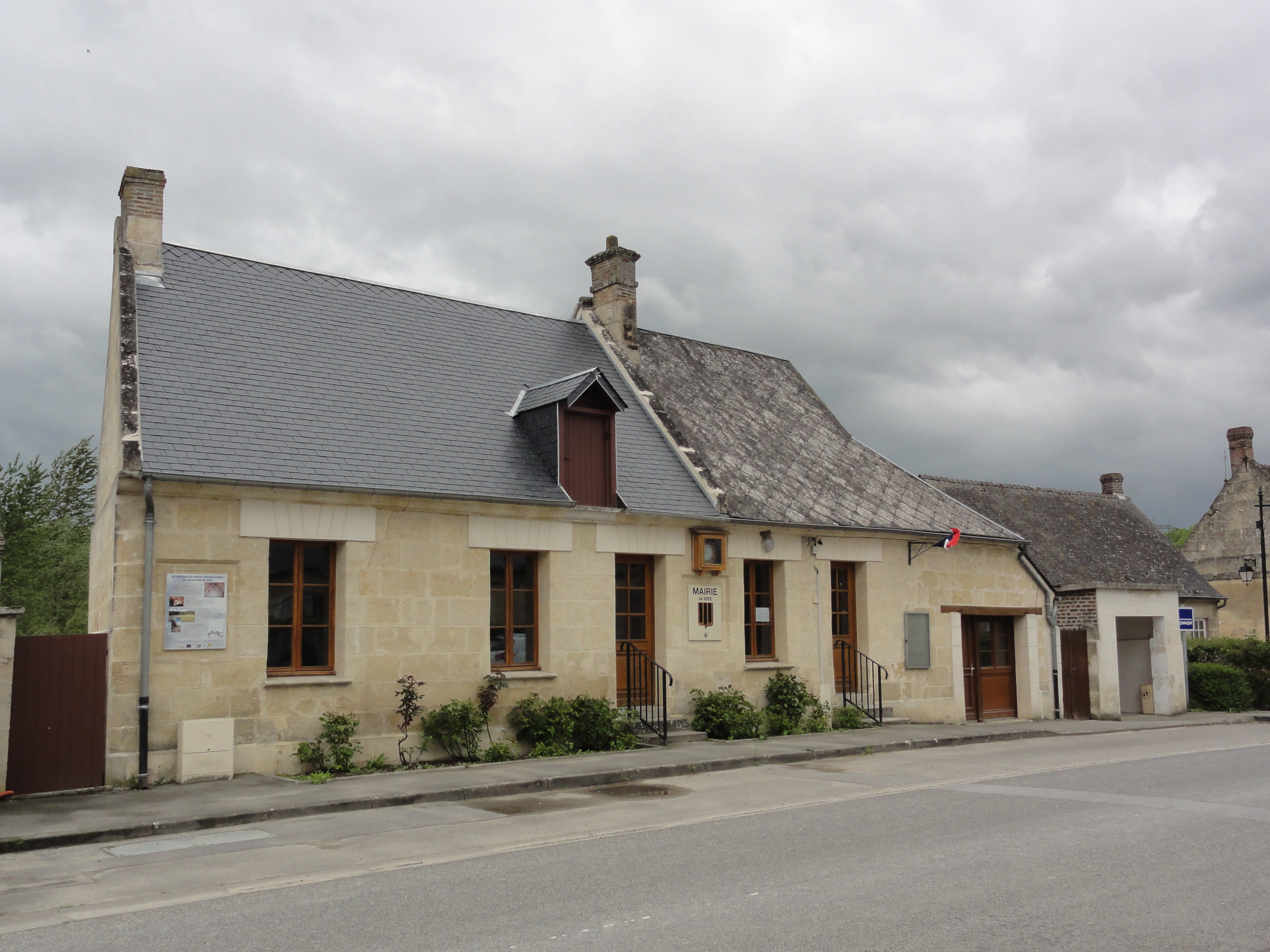
- The town hall of Brie

- Coat of arms
- Location of Brie
- Location within France Location within Hauts-de-France
- Coordinates: 49°36′05″N 3°29′00″E
- Country: France
- Region: Hauts-de-France
- Department: Aisne
- Arrondissement: Laon
- Canton: Tergnier
- Intercommunality: CA Chauny Tergnier La Fère

Government
  - Mayor (2026–32): Jack Guillaucourt
- Area^{1}: 2.8 km^{2} (1.1 sq mi)
- Elevation: 100 m (330 ft)
- Highest elevation: 191 m (627 ft)
- Lowest elevation: 79 m (259 ft)
- Population (2023): 55
  - Density: 20/km^{2} (51/sq mi)
- Time zone: UTC+01:00 (CET)
  - Summer (DST): UTC+02:00 (CEST)
- INSEE/Postal code: 02122 /02870
- ^{1} French Land Register data, which excludes lakes, ponds, glaciers > 1 km^{2} (0.386 sq mi or 247 acres) and river estuaries.

Brie (French pronunciation: [bʁi]) is a commune in the department of Aisne in Hauts-de-France in northern France.

== Council ==
Since the number of inhabitants of the commune is less than 100, the number of members of the municipal council is 7. The current mayor is Jack Guillaucourt, elected in 2026.

== Population ==
Historical population

| Year | Pop. | ±% p.a. |
|---|---|---|
| 1793 | 187 | — |
| 1821 | 201 | +0.26% |
| 1846 | 191 | −0.20% |
| 1872 | 149 | −0.95% |
| 1896 | 101 | −1.61% |
| 1926 | 106 | +0.16% |
| 1946 | 85 | −1.10% |
| 1962 | 97 | +0.83% |
| 1968 | 80 | −3.16% |

| Year | Pop. | ±% p.a. |
|---|---|---|
| 1975 | 73 | −1.30% |
| 1982 | 58 | −3.23% |
| 1990 | 60 | +0.42% |
| 1999 | 69 | +1.57% |
| 2007 | 57 | −2.36% |
| 2012 | 59 | +0.69% |
| 2017 | 53 | −2.12% |
| 2023 | 55 | +0.62% |

Source: EHESS and INSEE

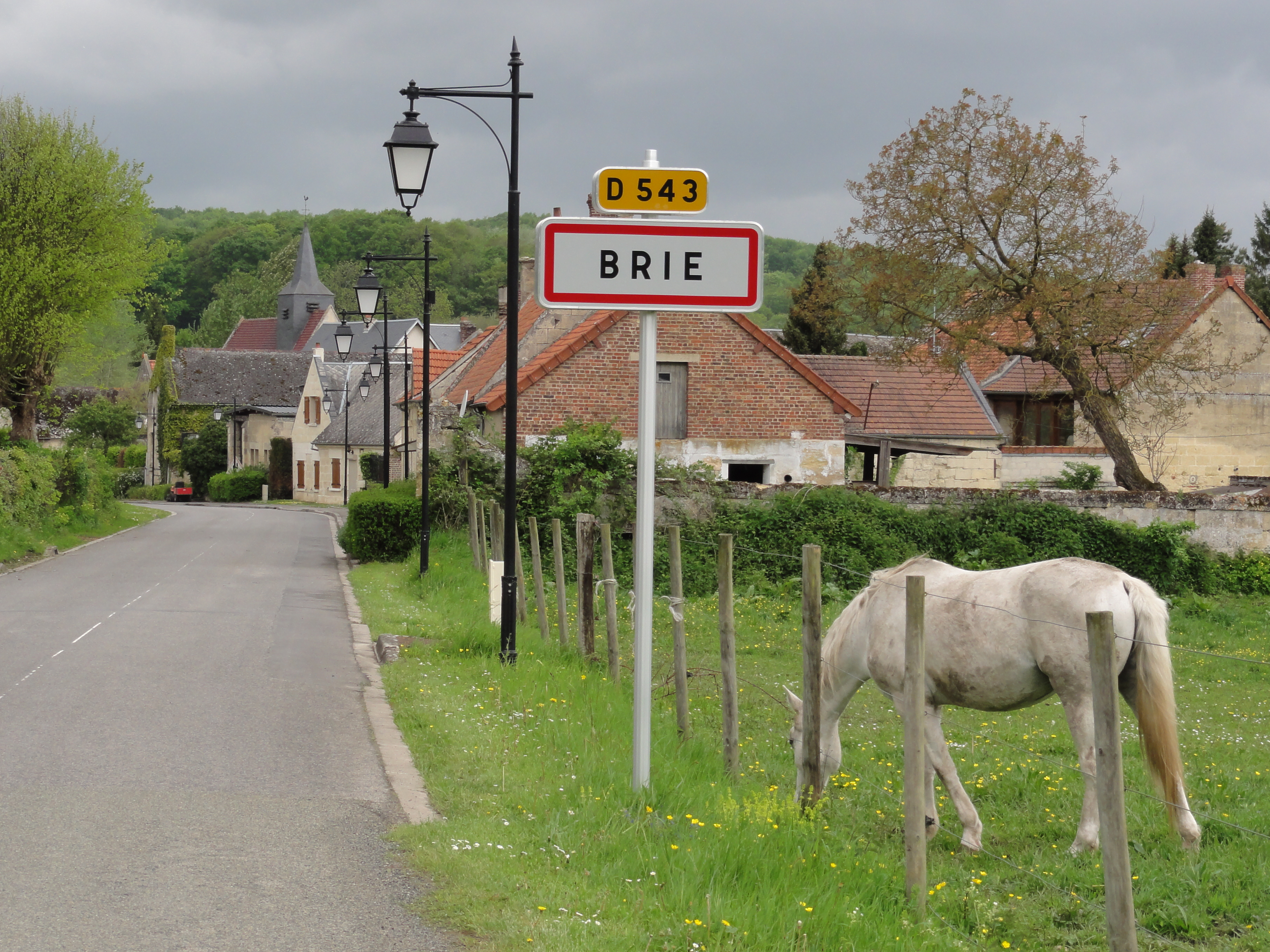
Entry to Brie

== See also ==
- Communes of the Aisne department
