= Fargniers =

Commune in France

Coordinates: 49°39′32″N 3°18′53″E

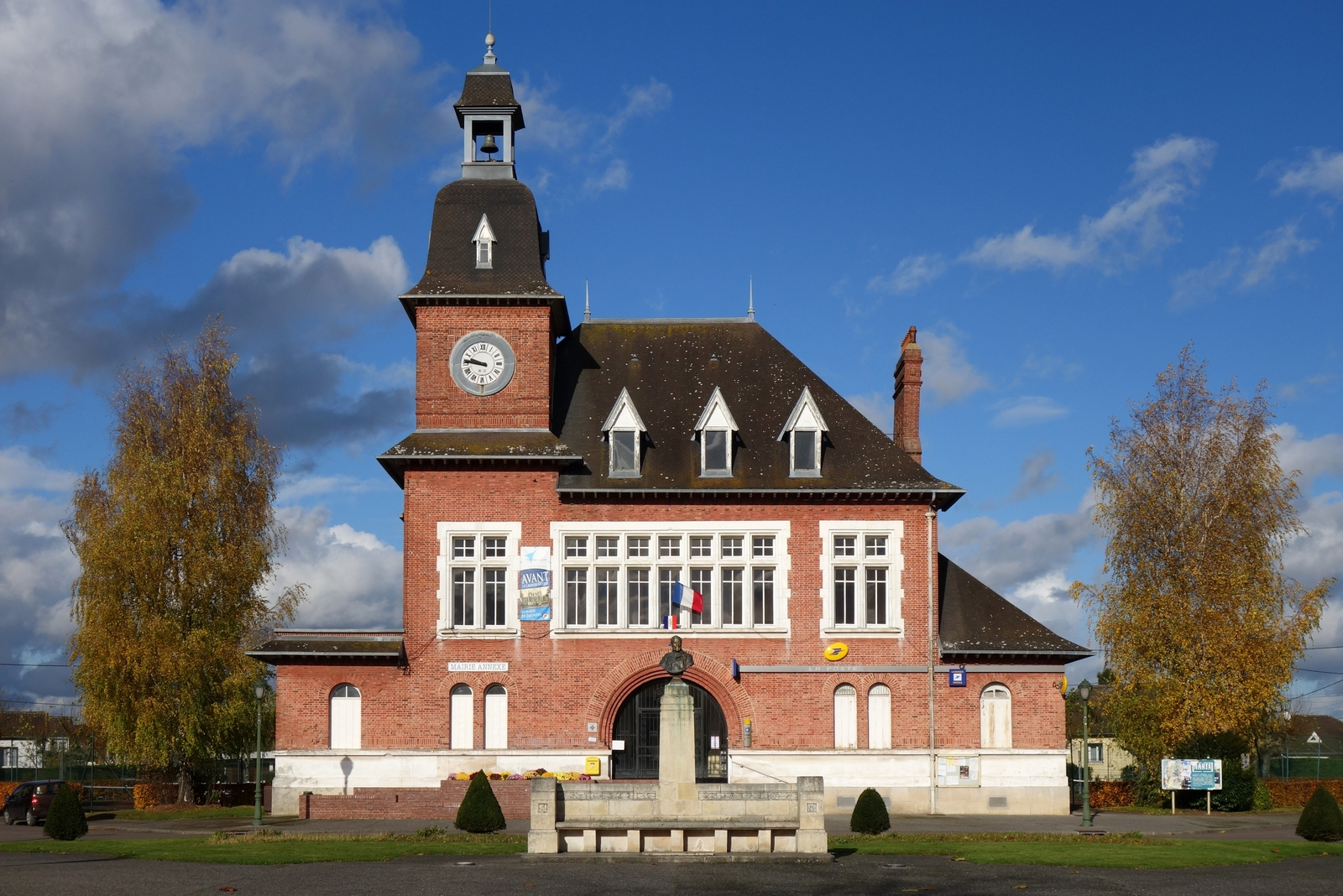
Former town hall of Fargniers on Place Carnegie

Fargniers is a part (an associated commune) of the commune (municipality) of Tergnier located in the French department of Aisne. A former independent municipality, Fargniers was absorbed by Tergnier in 1974. Its population is 3,328 (2022). Destroyed for 95% in the First World War, it was reconstructed in the 1920s with support from the Carnegie Endowment. The civil buildings (town hall, community hall, post office, kindergarten, girls' school, boys' school) lining the central square, Place Carnegie, have been listed as historic monuments.
