= Servais =

- Commune
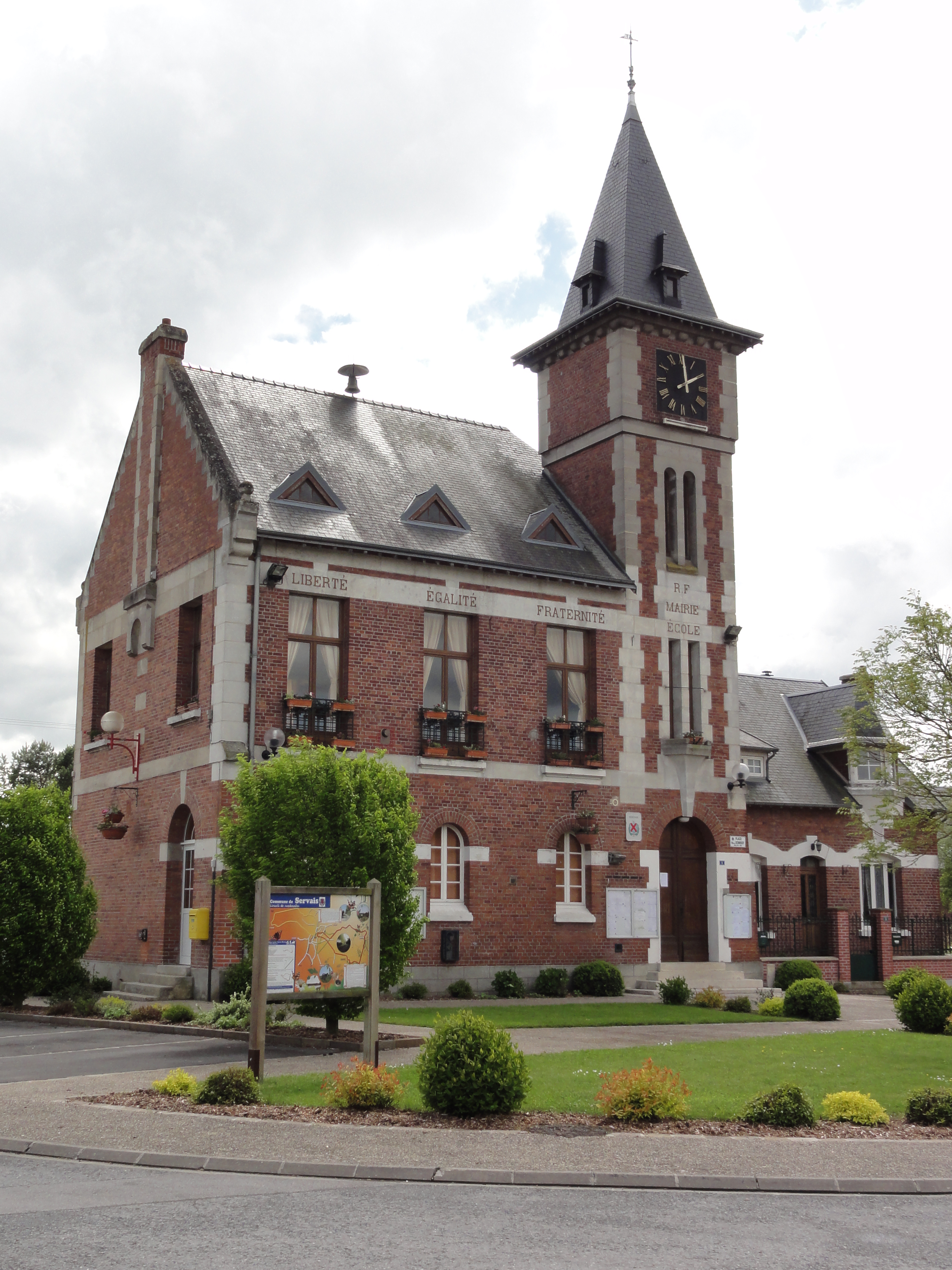
- The town hall of Servais

- Coat of arms
- Location of Servais
- Location within France Location within Hauts-de-France
- Coordinates: 49°37′16″N 3°20′40″E
- Country: France
- Region: Hauts-de-France
- Department: Aisne
- Arrondissement: Laon
- Canton: Tergnier
- Intercommunality: CA Chauny Tergnier La Fère

Government
  - Mayor (2026–32): Pascal Demont
- Area^{1}: 5.51 km^{2} (2.13 sq mi)
- Elevation: 64 m (210 ft)
- Highest elevation: 94 m (308 ft)
- Lowest elevation: 46 m (151 ft)
- Population (2023): 287
  - Density: 52.1/km^{2} (135/sq mi)
- Time zone: UTC+01:00 (CET)
  - Summer (DST): UTC+02:00 (CEST)
- INSEE/Postal code: 02716 /02700
- ^{1} French Land Register data, which excludes lakes, ponds, glaciers > 1 km^{2} (0.386 sq mi or 247 acres) and river estuaries.

Servais (French pronunciation: [sɛʁvɛ]) is a commune in the Aisne department in Hauts-de-France in northern France.

== Population ==
Historical population
Year	Pop.	±% p.a.
1968	287	—
1975	232	−2.99%
1982	271	+2.24%
1990	250	−1.00%
1999	240	−0.45%
2007	255	+0.76%
2012	305	+3.65%
2017	287	−1.21%
2023	287	+0.00%
Source: INSEE

== See also ==
- Communes of the Aisne department
