= Rogécourt =

- Commune
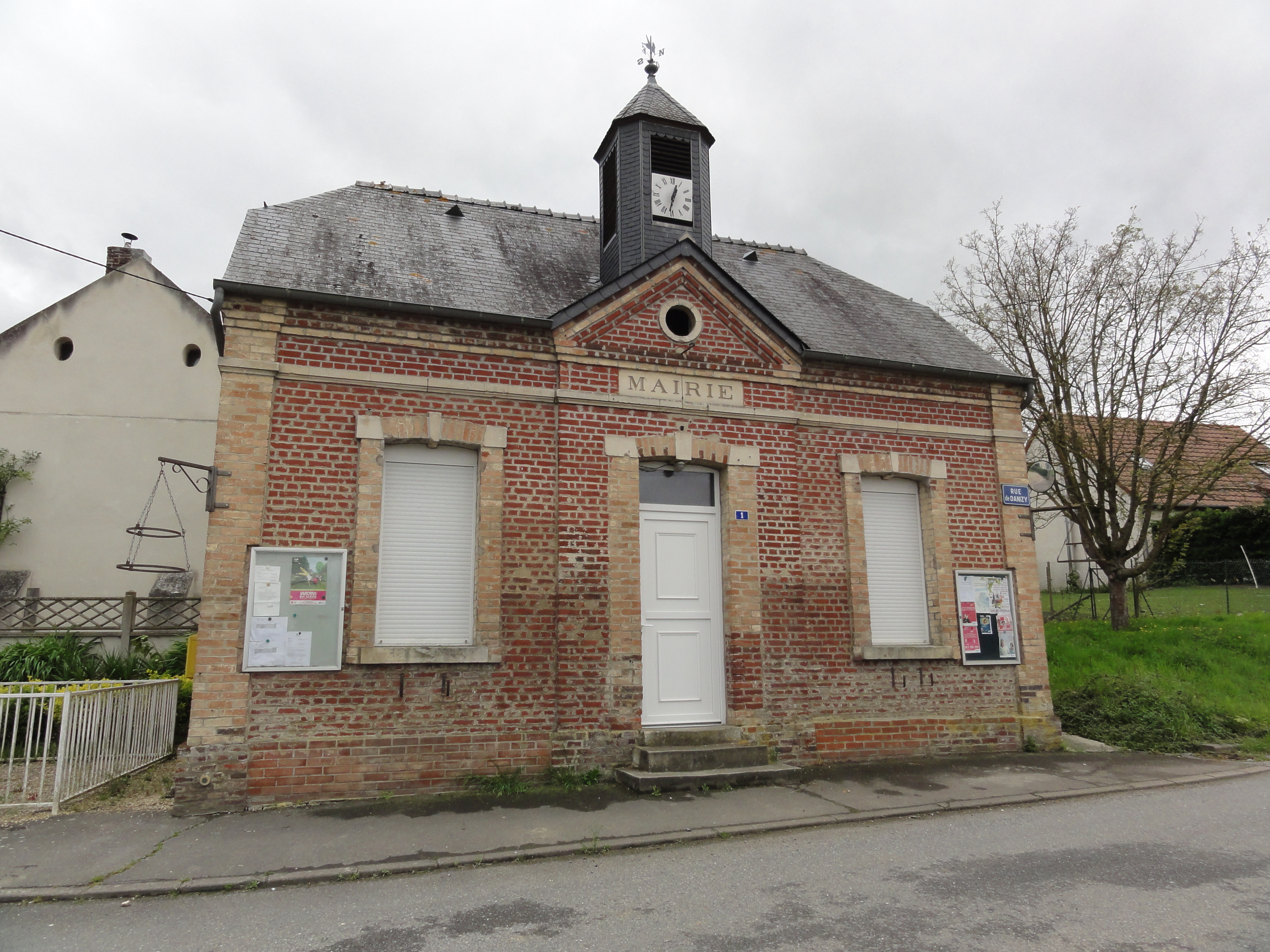
- The town hall of Rogécourt
- Location of Rogécourt
- Location within France Location within Hauts-de-France
- Coordinates: 49°39′12″N 3°25′40″E
- Country: France
- Region: Hauts-de-France
- Department: Aisne
- Arrondissement: Laon
- Canton: Tergnier
- Intercommunality: CA Chauny Tergnier La Fère

Government
  - Mayor (2026–32): Jean-Pierre Zangaré
- Area^{1}: 5.54 km^{2} (2.14 sq mi)
- Elevation: 90 m (300 ft)
- Highest elevation: 103 m (338 ft)
- Lowest elevation: 52 m (171 ft)
- Population (2023): 88
  - Density: 16/km^{2} (41/sq mi)
- Time zone: UTC+01:00 (CET)
  - Summer (DST): UTC+02:00 (CEST)
- INSEE/Postal code: 02651 /02800
- ^{1} French Land Register data, which excludes lakes, ponds, glaciers > 1 km^{2} (0.386 sq mi or 247 acres) and river estuaries.

Rogécourt (French pronunciation: [ʁɔʒekuʁ]) is a commune in the Aisne department in Hauts-de-France in northern France.

== Population ==
Historical population
| Year | Pop. | ±% p.a. |
|---|---|---|
| 1968 | 89 | — |
| 1975 | 79 | −1.69% |
| 1982 | 78 | −0.18% |
| 1990 | 91 | +1.95% |
| 1999 | 92 | +0.12% |
| 2007 | 78 | −2.04% |
| 2012 | 99 | +4.88% |
| 2017 | 105 | +1.18% |
| 2023 | 88 | −2.90% |
Source: INSEE

== See also ==
- Communes of the Aisne department
