= Charmes, Aisne =

Charmes
- Commune
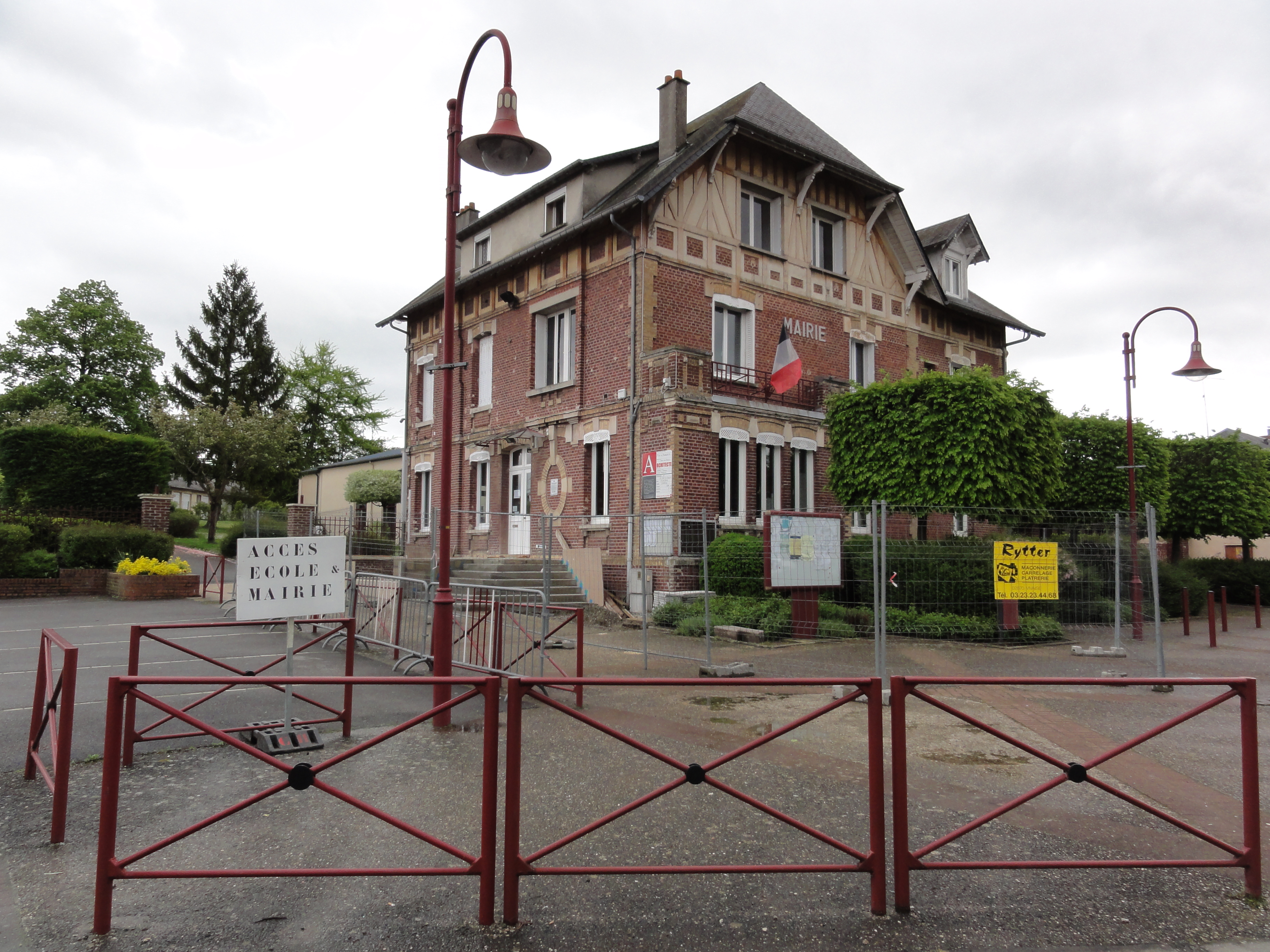
- The town hall of Charmes

- Coat of arms
- Location of Charmes
- Location within France Location within Hauts-de-France
- Coordinates: 49°39′06″N 3°22′43″E
- Country: France
- Region: Hauts-de-France
- Department: Aisne
- Arrondissement: Laon
- Canton: Tergnier
- Intercommunality: CA Chauny Tergnier La Fère

Government
  - Mayor (2026–32): Nicolas Thibeuf
- Area^{1}: 3.66 km^{2} (1.41 sq mi)
- Elevation: 45 m (148 ft)
- Highest elevation: 100 m (330 ft)
- Lowest elevation: 47 m (154 ft)
- Population (2023): 1,568
  - Density: 428/km^{2} (1,110/sq mi)
- Time zone: UTC+01:00 (CET)
  - Summer (DST): UTC+02:00 (CEST)
- INSEE/Postal code: 02165 /02800
- ^{1} French Land Register data, which excludes lakes, ponds, glaciers > 1 km^{2} (0.386 sq mi or 247 acres) and river estuaries.

Charmes (French pronunciation: [ʃaʁm]) is a commune in the Aisne department in Hauts-de-France in northern France.

== Population ==
Historical population
Year	Pop.	±% p.a.
1968	1,910	—
1975	1,778	−1.02%
1982	1,751	−0.22%
1990	1,855	+0.72%
1999	1,749	−0.65%
2007	1,693	−0.41%
2012	1,642	−0.61%
2017	1,652	+0.12%
2023	1,568	−0.87%
Source: INSEE

== See also ==
- Communes of the Aisne department
