= Danizy =

- Commune
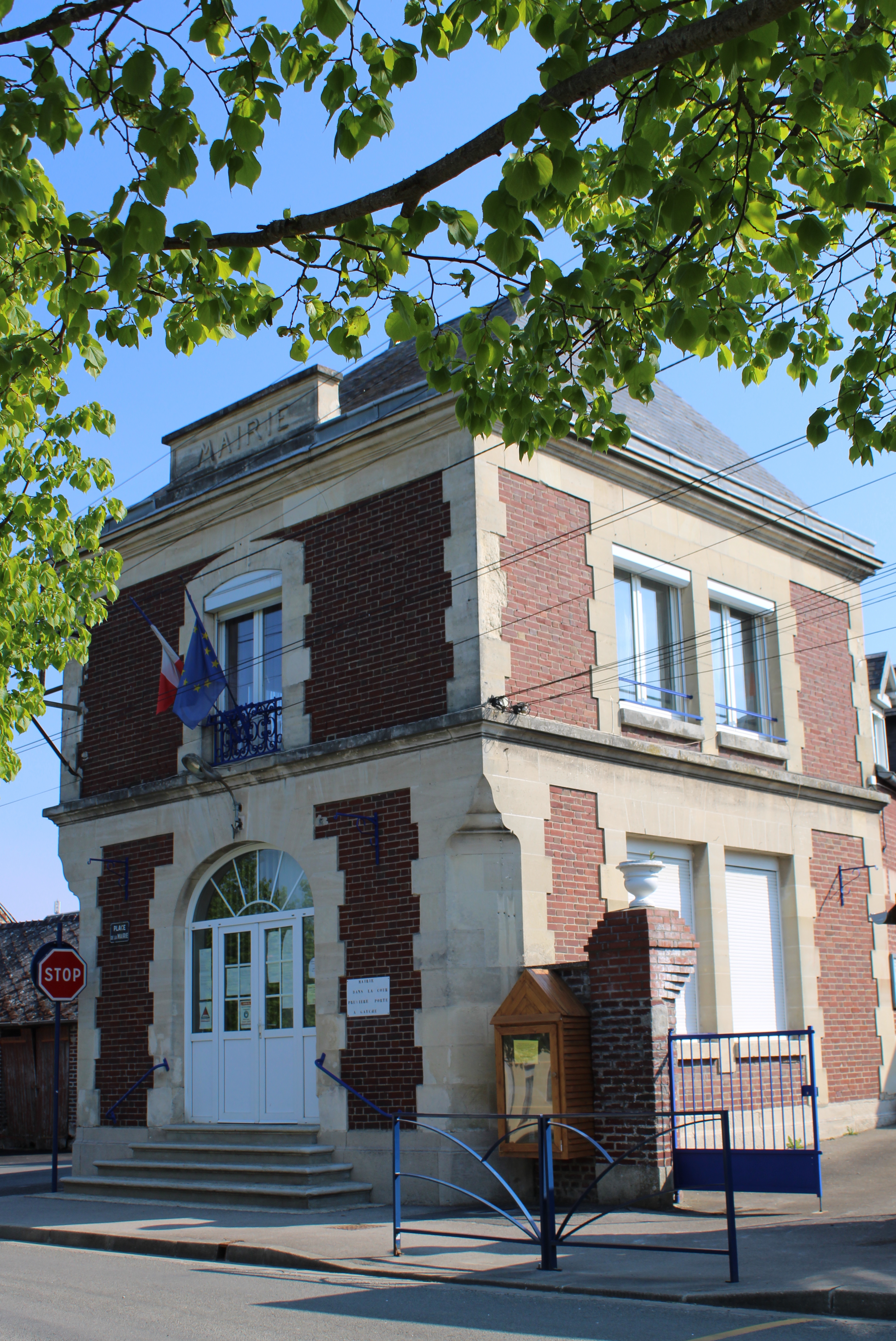
- The town hall of Danizy

- Coat of arms
- Location of Danizy
- Location within France Location within Hauts-de-France
- Coordinates: 49°39′55″N 3°23′35″E
- Country: France
- Region: Hauts-de-France
- Department: Aisne
- Arrondissement: Laon
- Canton: Tergnier
- Intercommunality: CA Chauny Tergnier La Fère

Government
  - Mayor (2026–32): Philippe Sergeant
- Area^{1}: 4.49 km^{2} (1.73 sq mi)
- Elevation: 73 m (240 ft)
- Highest elevation: 93 m (305 ft)
- Lowest elevation: 49 m (161 ft)
- Population (2023): 609
  - Density: 136/km^{2} (351/sq mi)
- Time zone: UTC+01:00 (CET)
  - Summer (DST): UTC+02:00 (CEST)
- INSEE/Postal code: 02260 /02800
- ^{1} French Land Register data, which excludes lakes, ponds, glaciers > 1 km^{2} (0.386 sq mi or 247 acres) and river estuaries.

Danizy (French pronunciation: [danizi]) is a commune in the Aisne department in Hauts-de-France in northern France.

== Population ==
Historical population
Year	Pop.	±% p.a.
1968	492	—
1975	586	+2.53%
1982	619	+0.79%
1990	560	−1.24%
1999	560	+0.00%
2007	553	−0.16%
2012	591	+1.34%
2017	650	+1.92%
2023	609	−1.08%
Source: INSEE

== See also ==
- Communes of the Aisne department
