= Tergnier =

- Commune
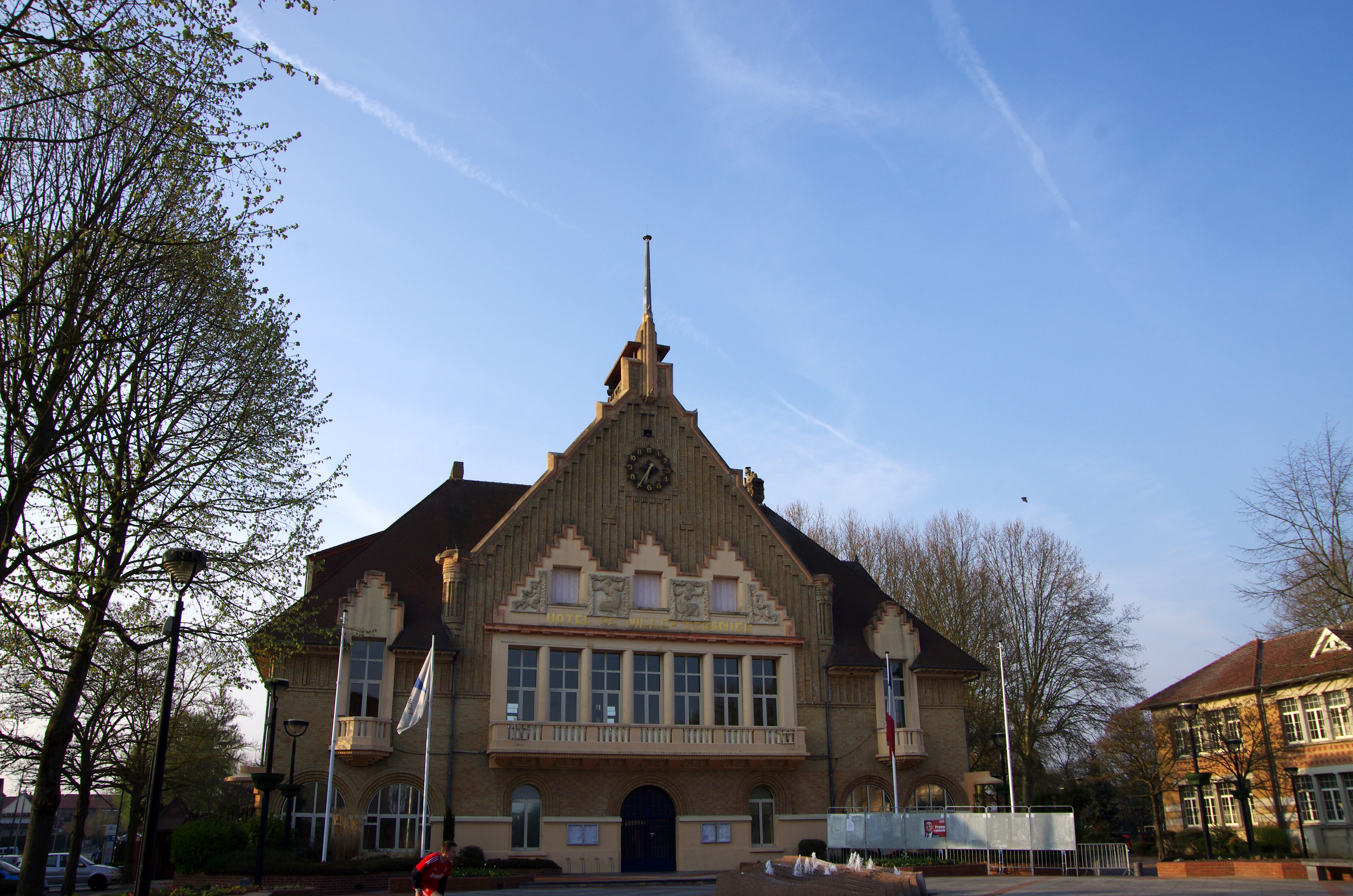
- Town hall

- Coat of arms
- Location of Tergnier
- Location within France Location within Hauts-de-France
- Coordinates: 49°39′23″N 3°17′18″E
- Country: France
- Region: Hauts-de-France
- Department: Aisne
- Arrondissement: Laon
- Canton: Tergnier
- Intercommunality: CA Chauny Tergnier La Fère

Government
  - Mayor (2026–32): Aurélien Gall
- Area^{1}: 17.98 km^{2} (6.94 sq mi)
- Elevation: 53 m (174 ft)
- Highest elevation: 90 m (300 ft)
- Lowest elevation: 44 m (144 ft)
- Population (2023): 13,045
  - Density: 725.5/km^{2} (1,879/sq mi)
- Time zone: UTC+01:00 (CET)
  - Summer (DST): UTC+02:00 (CEST)
- INSEE/Postal code: 02738 /02700
- ^{1} French Land Register data, which excludes lakes, ponds, glaciers > 1 km^{2} (0.386 sq mi or 247 acres) and river estuaries.

Tergnier (French pronunciation: [tɛʁɲe]) is a commune in the department of Aisne, Hauts-de-France, France. Its location on the Canal de Saint-Quentin and the Creil–Jeumont railway (Tergnier station) supported its development as an industrial centre in the second half of the 19th century.

== Politics and administration ==
The commune of Tergnier absorbed the former communes of Fargniers and Vouël in 1974, and Quessy in 1992. Since the 2020 municipal elections, Michel Carreau has been the mayor of Tergnier.

Tergnier is twinned with the municipality of Wolfhagen (Germany) since 17 May 1981.

== Population ==
The population data in the table and graph below refer to the commune of Tergnier proper, in its geography at the given years, i.e. excluding former communes that were absorbed at a later date.

Historical population

Year	Pop.	±% p.a.
1793	222	—
1800	249	+1.65%
1806	263	+0.92%
1821	223	−1.09%
1831	269	+1.89%
1836	258	−0.83%
1841	276	+1.36%
1846	273	−0.22%
1851	304	+2.17%
1856	862	+23.18%
1861	1,235	+7.46%
1866	1,806	+7.90%
1872	2,572	+6.07%
1876	3,079	+4.60%
1881	3,536	+2.81%
1886	3,708	+0.95%
1891	3,740	+0.17%
1896	3,960	+1.15%
1901	4,084	+0.62%

Year	Pop.	±% p.a.
1906	4,307	+1.07%
1911	4,898	+2.61%
1921	2,076	−8.23%
1926	3,453	+10.71%
1931	4,080	+3.39%
1936	4,357	+1.32%
1946	3,370	−2.54%
1954	5,002	+5.06%
1962	5,827	+1.93%
1968	5,949	+0.35%
1975	11,736	+10.19%
1982	12,032	+0.36%
1990	11,698	−0.35%
1999	15,069	+2.85%
2007	14,722	−0.29%
2012	14,110	−0.85%
2017	13,456	−0.94%
2023	13,045	−0.52%

Source: EHESS and INSEE (1968-2023)

== See also ==
- Communes of the Aisne department
