= Travecy =

- Commune
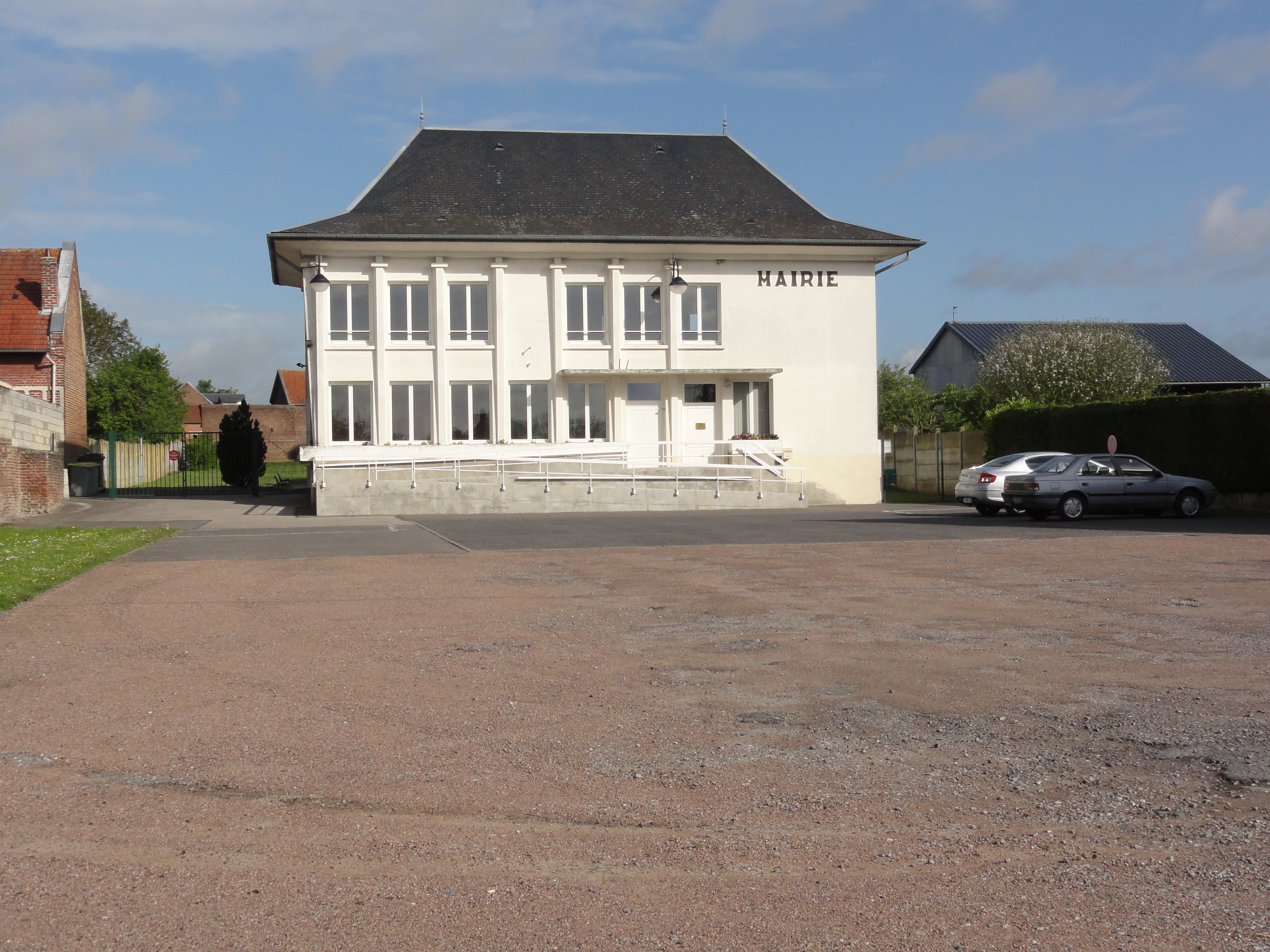
- The town hall of Travecy
- Location of Travecy
- Location within France Location within Hauts-de-France
- Coordinates: 49°41′19″N 3°21′36″E
- Country: France
- Region: Hauts-de-France
- Department: Aisne
- Arrondissement: Laon
- Canton: Tergnier
- Intercommunality: CA Chauny Tergnier La Fère

Government
  - Mayor (2026–32): Laurent Péné
- Area^{1}: 14.52 km^{2} (5.61 sq mi)
- Elevation: 83 m (272 ft)
- Highest elevation: 92 m (302 ft)
- Lowest elevation: 47 m (154 ft)
- Population (2023): 685
  - Density: 47.2/km^{2} (122/sq mi)
- Time zone: UTC+01:00 (CET)
  - Summer (DST): UTC+02:00 (CEST)
- INSEE/Postal code: 02746 /02800
- ^{1} French Land Register data, which excludes lakes, ponds, glaciers > 1 km^{2} (0.386 sq mi or 247 acres) and river estuaries.

Travecy (French pronunciation: [tʁavsi]) is a commune in the Aisne department in Hauts-de-France in northern France.

== Population ==
Historical population
Year	Pop.	±% p.a.
1968	811	—
1975	642	−3.28%
1982	671	+0.63%
1990	614	−1.10%
1999	643	+0.51%
2007	612	−0.62%
2012	670	+1.83%
2017	670	+0.00%
2023	685	+0.37%
Source: INSEE

== See also ==
- Communes of the Aisne department
