= Deuillet =

- Commune
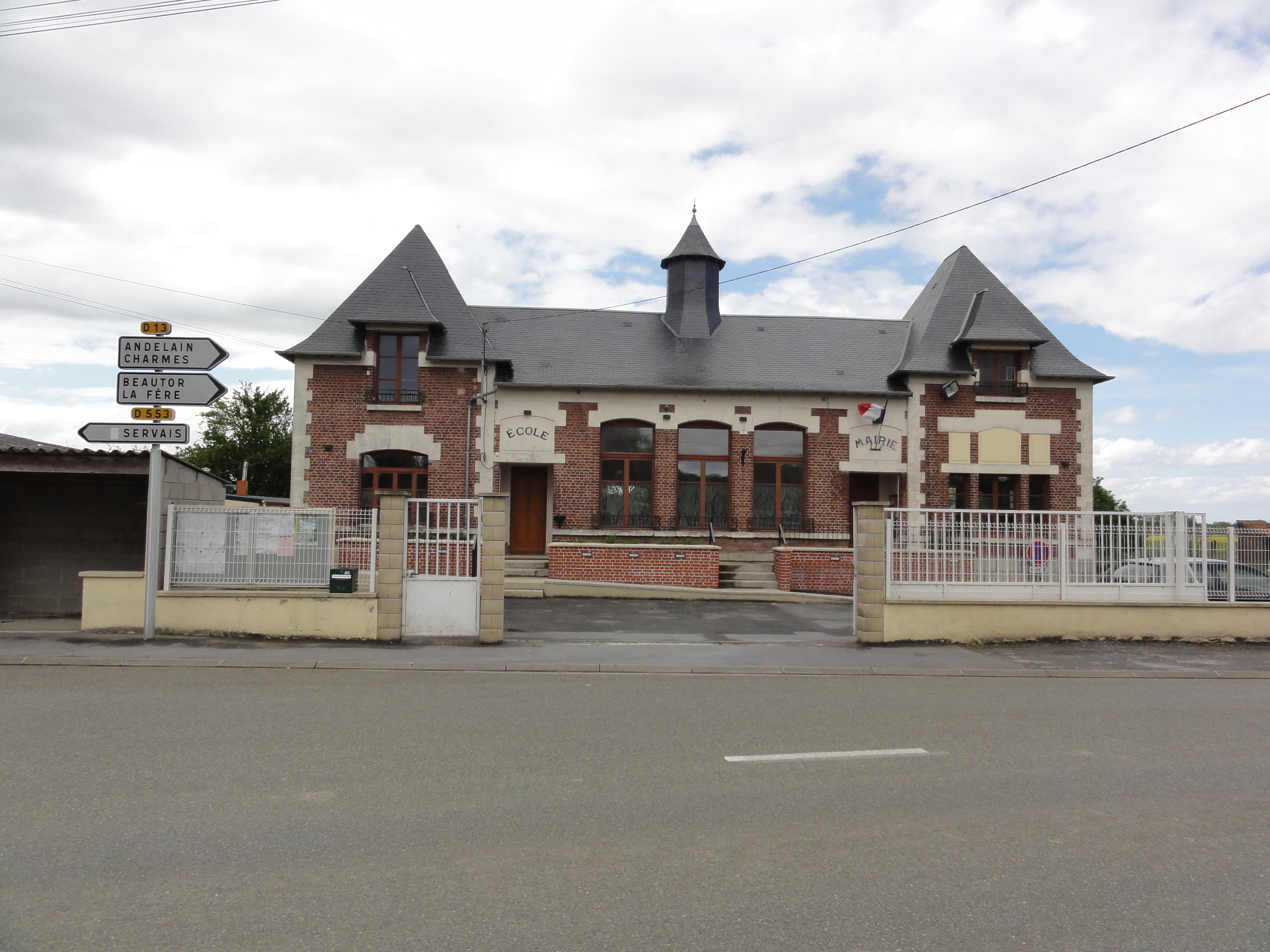
- The town hall and school of Deuillet
- Location of Deuillet
- Location within France Location within Hauts-de-France
- Coordinates: 49°37′51″N 3°21′44″E
- Country: France
- Region: Hauts-de-France
- Department: Aisne
- Arrondissement: Laon
- Canton: Tergnier
- Intercommunality: CA Chauny Tergnier La Fère

Government
  - Mayor (2026–32): Frédéric Letagneaux
- Area^{1}: 3.76 km^{2} (1.45 sq mi)
- Elevation: 60 m (200 ft)
- Highest elevation: 97 m (318 ft)
- Lowest elevation: 46 m (151 ft)
- Population (2023): 208
  - Density: 55.3/km^{2} (143/sq mi)
- Time zone: UTC+01:00 (CET)
  - Summer (DST): UTC+02:00 (CEST)
- INSEE/Postal code: 02262 /02700
- ^{1} French Land Register data, which excludes lakes, ponds, glaciers > 1 km^{2} (0.386 sq mi or 247 acres) and river estuaries.

Deuillet (French pronunciation: [dœjɛ]) is a commune in the Aisne department in Hauts-de-France in northern France.

== Population ==
Historical population
Year	Pop.	±% p.a.
1968	100	—
1975	108	+1.11%
1982	149	+4.70%
1990	159	+0.82%
1999	165	+0.41%
2007	203	+2.62%
2012	234	+2.88%
2017	216	−1.59%
2023	208	−0.63%
Source: INSEE

== See also ==
- Communes of the Aisne department
