= Mayot =

- Commune
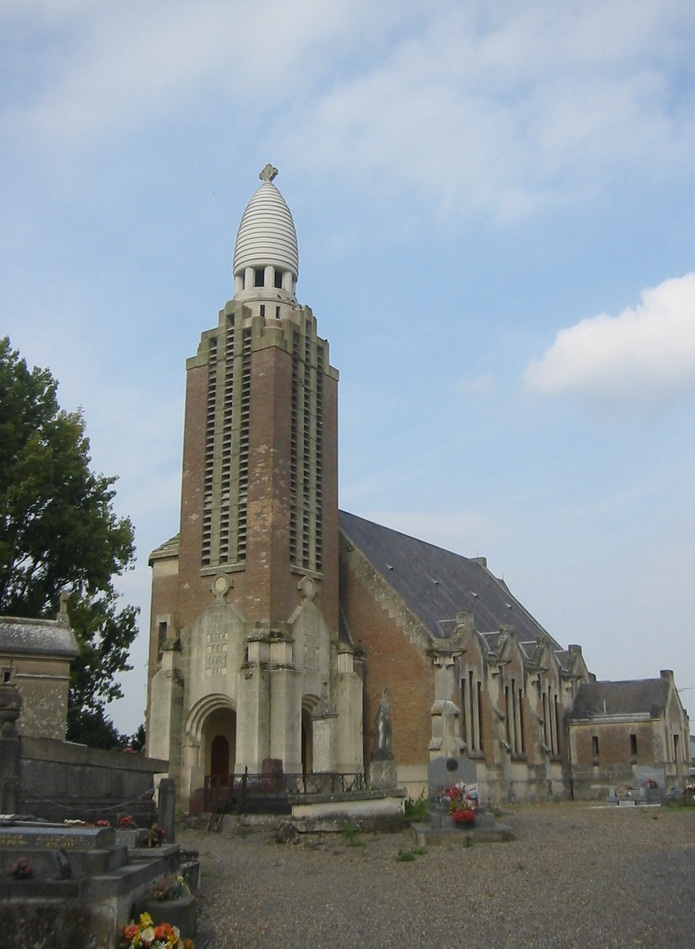
- The church of Mayot
- Location of Mayot
- Location within France Location within Hauts-de-France
- Coordinates: 49°42′17″N 3°23′07″E
- Country: France
- Region: Hauts-de-France
- Department: Aisne
- Arrondissement: Laon
- Canton: Tergnier
- Intercommunality: CA Chauny Tergnier La Fère

Government
  - Mayor (2026–32): Stéphane Lebarbier
- Area^{1}: 3.42 km^{2} (1.32 sq mi)
- Elevation: 56 m (184 ft)
- Highest elevation: 116 m (381 ft)
- Lowest elevation: 51 m (167 ft)
- Population (2023): 207
  - Density: 60.5/km^{2} (157/sq mi)
- Time zone: UTC+01:00 (CET)
  - Summer (DST): UTC+02:00 (CEST)
- INSEE/Postal code: 02473 /02800
- ^{1} French Land Register data, which excludes lakes, ponds, glaciers > 1 km^{2} (0.386 sq mi or 247 acres) and river estuaries.

Mayot (French pronunciation: [majo]) is a commune in the Aisne department in Hauts-de-France in northern France.

== Population ==
Historical population
Year	Pop.	±% p.a.
1968	236	—
1975	202	−2.20%
1982	183	−1.40%
1990	182	−0.07%
1999	176	−0.37%
2007	174	−0.14%
2012	190	+1.77%
2017	211	+2.12%
2023	207	−0.32%
Source: INSEE

== See also ==
- Communes of the Aisne department
