= Battle of Moreuil Wood =

1918 World War I battle

Coordinates: 49°46′59″N 2°30′00″E

- Part of Operation Michael (1918 Spring Offensive)
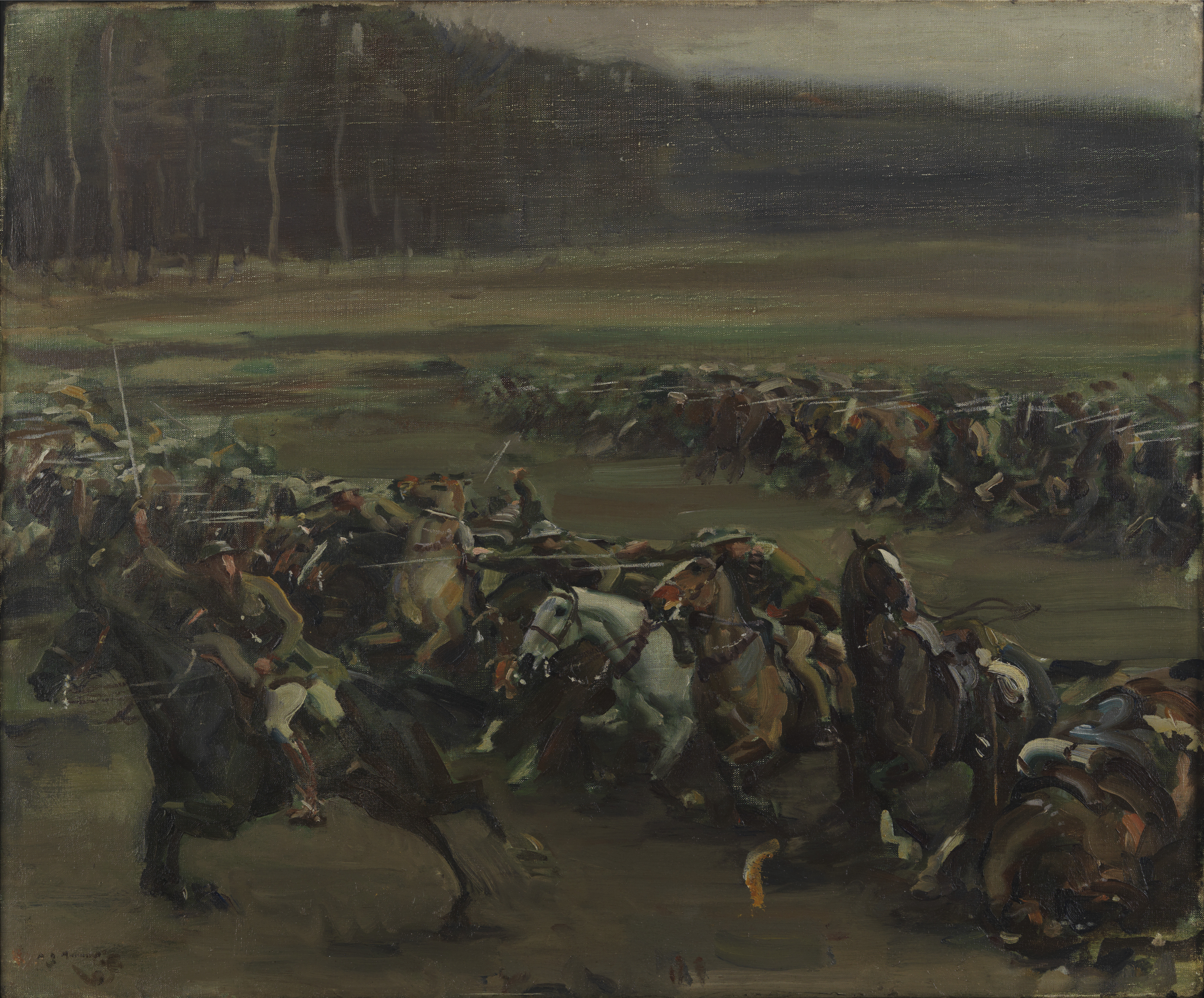
- Charge of Flowerdew's Squadron by Alfred Munnings portraying the Allied cavalry attack against the Germans at Moreuil Wood.
Date	30 March 1918
Location	Southeast of Amiens in Moreuil, France, on the banks of the Avre River.
Result	See Aftermath section
Territorial changes	German victory. German forces gain control of Moreuil Wood and its surrounding area on the Somme river.

Belligerents
United Kingdom; Canada	Germany

Commanders and leaders
(United Kingdom) J. E. B. Seely	(German Empire) Erich Ludendorff

Strength
Units of The Royal Canadian Dragoons; Units of Lord Strathcona’s Horse; Units of the Fort Garry Horse; Units of the 3rd Cavalry Division	23rd Saxon Division

Casualties and losses
305	unknown

The Battle of Moreuil Wood (30 March 1918) was an engagement of World War I that took place on the banks of the river Avre in France, where the Canadian Cavalry Brigade attacked and forced the German 23rd Saxon Division to withdraw from Moreuil Wood, a commanding position on the river bank. While the Germans ultimately succeeded in recapturing the wood by the battle's end, the delay caused by the Allies contributed to the halt of the Spring Offensive. During the battle, a Victoria Cross was awarded to Canadian Gordon Flowerdew of Lord Strathcona's Horse.

== Background ==
By March 1918, the three years of stalemate seen in the First World War on the Western Front were about to end.

Russia had departed from the war thanks to the Bolshevik Revolution and peace negotiations, the United States had not yet established a strong fighting force in Europe, and the French Army had suffered heavily, and had disbanded many divisions in order to keep others fully manned. This left the British forces as the most formidable on the Western Front, but they had vital reinforcements withheld by the Prime Minister David Lloyd George, who was concerned that the British Expeditionary Force commander, Field Marshal Sir Douglas Haig, would feed them into a slaughter like those of 1916 and 1917.

With divisions freed up by the winding-down of the Eastern Front and victory against the Italians at Caporetto, General Erich Ludendorff of the German High Command thought the time ripe for a successful offensive. Much of the German Army in the west consisted of worn-out "trench" divisions, but the spearhead German divisions were fully manned, well equipped, and experienced. Three German armies (2nd, 17th and 18th), would break through the weakest section of the Allied lines, the areas of the British 5th and 3rd Armies. On 21 March 1918, at 04:00 and under the cover of a heavy artillery barrage, the German offensive began. The British, part of whose defences was a 40-kilometre-long stretch of poorly prepared trenches recently taken over from the French, were quickly forced to withdraw.

On 23 March the German forces broke through to the village of Ham, and the 3rd Cavalry Division, commanded by Brigadier-General A.E.W. Harman, was ordered to the village of Bouchoire along with 200 men from the Canadian Cavalry Brigade. As the German advance moved onwards, the newly formed force fought actions at Cugny, Villeselve, La Neuville-en-Beine and Beaumont-en-Beine. On 26 March, the enemy broke through the lines, and Allied forces began a withdrawal with the force under Harman conducting rearguard actions. By this time, the German advance had penetrated up to 45 kilometres (28 mi) into Allied positions; however, by this time supply lines were beginning to be stretched, and Ludendorff diverted his objectives and thus lost some momentum of his attack while he attempted to drive a wedge through between British and French forces.

By 30 March the attack was renewed; however, by this time the Allied forces had rallied and received reinforcements. By the morning of 30 March, the German 23rd Saxon Division had occupied the Moreuil Woods overlooking the river Avre and controlling the Amiens–Paris railway.

== Battle ==
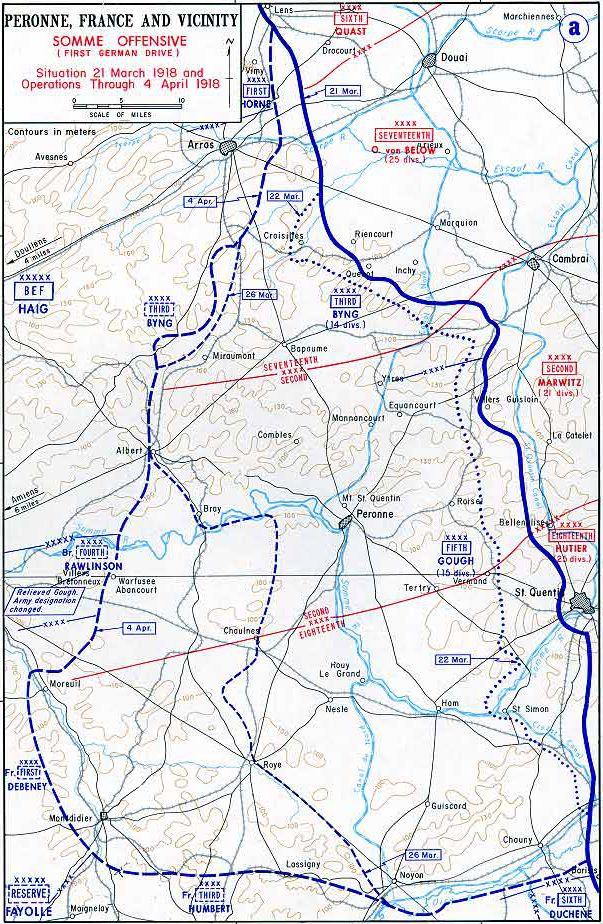
Map depicting the extent of the German spring offensive, 21 March to 5 April 1918. Moreuil Wood is on the bottom left of the map.

At 08:30 on 30 March, General Seely and his aides travelled towards the Moreuil Woods from where his forces were stationed on the other side of the River Avre, with orders to cross the river and delay the enemy advance as much as possible. At 09:30, upon reaching the wood, having received fire from German forces that were occupying it, Seely ordered The Royal Canadian Dragoons to send sections to protect the village of Moreuil, while other sections were to seize the northeast corner of the wood itself. While this was being undertaken, Lord Strathcona's Horse was ordered to occupy the southeast face of the wood and disperse any German units found there (both the Royal Canadian Dragoons and Lord Strathcona's Horse were two units making up the Canadian Cavalry Brigade).

The remaining squadrons of the Canadian Cavalry Brigade (the Fort Garry Horse) were ordered to enter the wood from the northwest, and sweep through it towards the eastern face where Lord Strathcona's Horse was awaiting them. After being driven back from their first assault by machine gun fire, the cavalry units dismounted and proceeded to attack a second time with fixed bayonets, driving German forces from the edge of the wood and into its centre. Hand-to-hand fighting broke out in several locations with swords and pistols as Allied forces fought through the German 101st Grenadiers, who became disorganised and demoralised.

=== Inside the Moreuil wood ===
As Canadian cavalry fought through the wood, they were channelled eastwards by German machine gun fire. Simultaneously, units of the Royal Canadian Dragoons were forced to wheel into the woods at the north due to German attack. This battle quickly became a series of separate engagements due to the nature of the battlefield, with units separated and dispersed inside the German formations, and the fact that horses were ineffective in the woodland led to the pace of the battle slowing down considerably.

By this time, the remainder of the 3rd Cavalry had crossed the river and was distributed around the wood to support various Canadian forces currently engaged with German forces, many of these reinforcements were instructed to dismount before entering the battle. At this time, units from Lord Strathcona's Horse were formed into scouting teams of around ten men each and sent to discover details about the enemy forces and positions.

The commander of 'C' Squadron Lord Strathcona's Horse, Lieutenant Gordon Flowerdew, ordered his forces to secure the northeast corner then report back to him. Flowerdew was then ordered to cut off the German forces who were retreating to the east in the face of the Allied forces advancing through the wood. During this time, the forces dispatched by Flowerdew to the northeast corner ambushed and killed German forces looting from a French wagon, then dismounted and entered the wood under fire. Flowerdew arrived, assessed the situation, and decided that his unit would move to cut off the German retreat while the other section would help to drive the Germans from the wood.

There were six squadrons of cavalry in the wood at this point. Aeroplanes from the Royal Flying Corps were also attacking German forces from overhead, dropping 109 bombs and firing 17,000 bullets. Cavalry forces approached the southwest corner of the woods, coming under heavy fire and suffering heavy casualties, and they were forced to halt temporarily. Flowerdew reached high ground at the northeast corner of the wood just in time to encounter a 300-strong German force from the 101st Grenadiers, who were withdrawing. Flowerdew ordered, "It's a charge boys, it's a charge!" however, the bugle call was silenced by German fire before it was even sounded. During the charge, both sides were decimated, with only 51 of his unit still alive. Flowerdew died of his wounds the next day at No. 41 Casualty Clearing Station.

By 11:00 only the southern point of the wood was still occupied by German forces. With reinforcements arriving for the British, Seely ordered the remaining Germans to be driven away. Seely ordered British artillery fire into the wood to cease so he could operate without fear of friendly fire. The Germans were routed from the wood, and the day ended with 305 Allied casualties but the wood was in Allied hands.

=== The following morning ===
The next morning, the 31 March, a German attack recaptured most of the wood, and the nearby Rifle Wood one mile to the northeast. General Seely was given command of the Allied counterattack. The Canadian Brigade attacked in three waves, securing their flanks whilst moving through the wood, and engaging the enemy in hand-to-hand combat. Once the German forces were again driven out, they commenced heavy artillery bombardment and several counterattacks; however, control of the wood remained with the Allies at the end of the day. To the northeast, Rifle Wood was attacked at 09:00 and by 11:00 was also in Allied hands. By 15:00, the Allied forces were relieved by fresh divisions.

Despite German forces eventually regaining control of the Moreuil woods and surrounding area, Ludendorff ended the offensive on the 5 April 1918.

== Aftermath ==
The German offensive had come to an end after dogged Allied resistance. Despite capturing 1,930 square kilometres (750 sq mi) of territory, it was at a cost of 250,000 men killed, wounded or missing. In the poor economic state of Germany by this time in the war, they could never recover such losses. The Allies, in comparison, lost 240,000. The strength of Allied forces in defence and in slowing down the German advance in engagements such as those at Moreuil Wood contributed to the ultimate defeat of the German offensive.

After the end of the German offensive, David Lloyd George sent the reinforcements to Haig. The American presence also increased from 162,000 to 318,000. The Allies launched their own counter-offensives starting at Amiens just north of Moreuil Wood, which proved to be a decisive victory for the Allies. Ludendorff commented after the first day of battle that it was a black day for the German army.

Flowerdew's posthumous Victoria Cross for his charge on the German forces was one of twenty that would be awarded during the German and later Allied offensive.

The Moreuil Wood was finally taken from the Germans in August by French forces, with elements of the Canadian Cavalry taking Rifle Wood.

Other medals won at the battle include:

- One Distinguished Service Order
- Eight Military Crosses
- Eight Distinguished Conduct Medals
- Forty-two Military Medals

This battle also caused the destruction of the Moreuil Castle, an estate of the family of Rougé, inherited from the Lords of Créquy, Princes of Poix and Dukes of Lesdiguières.

== See also ==
- List of Canadian battles during World War I
- Horses in World War I

External images
- Remembrance ceremony of Battle of Moreuil Wood 1
- Remembrance ceremony of Battle of Moreuil Wood 2
