= 02461 =

02461 may refer to:

- Cotillas, a municipality in Castile-La Mancha, Spain
- Ellispontos, a former municipality in Western Macedonia, Greece
- Marest-Dampcourt, a commune in Aisne department, France
- Newton Highlands, Massachusetts, U.S., a village of Newton, Massachusetts
