= Autreville, Aisne =

Autreville
- Commune
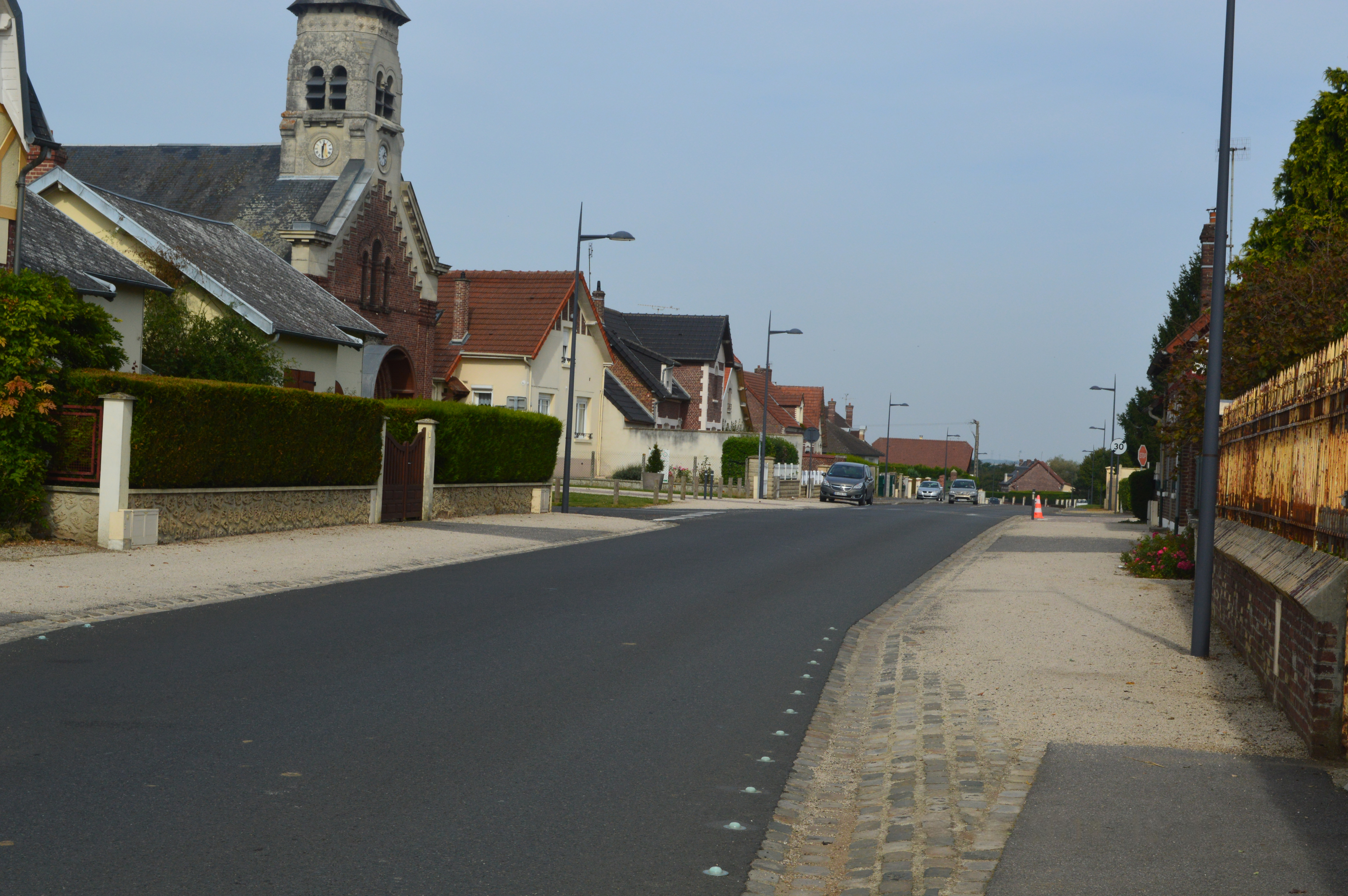
- Location of Autreville
- Location within France Location within Hauts-de-France
- Coordinates: 49°35′08″N 3°14′27″E
- Country: France
- Region: Hauts-de-France
- Department: Aisne
- Arrondissement: Laon
- Canton: Chauny
- Intercommunality: CA Chauny Tergnier La Fère

Government
  - Mayor (2026–32): El Houssain Driouch
- Area^{1}: 3.55 km^{2} (1.37 sq mi)
- Elevation: 64 m (210 ft)
- Highest elevation: 68 m (223 ft)
- Lowest elevation: 42 m (138 ft)
- Population (2023): 777
  - Density: 219/km^{2} (567/sq mi)
- Time zone: UTC+01:00 (CET)
  - Summer (DST): UTC+02:00 (CEST)
- INSEE/Postal code: 02041 /02300
- ^{1} French Land Register data, which excludes lakes, ponds, glaciers > 1 km^{2} (0.386 sq mi or 247 acres) and river estuaries.

Autreville (French pronunciation: [otʁəvil]) is a commune in the department of Aisne in the Hauts-de-France region of northern France.

== Geography ==
Autreville is located 3 km south by southeast of Chauny and 20 km east of Noyon. It can be accessed by the D937 road coming south from Chauny through the heart of the commune and the village and continuing south to Pierremande. The D6 road goes west from the D937 north of the village to Manicamp and the D7 goes east from the D937 to Sinceny. The urban area of Sinceny extends west into the commune in the north. Apart from the urban areas and small forests in the north, west, and south, the commune is entirely farmland.

The Oise river passes to the north of the commune and the Canal Saint-Lazare branches off it and through the north of the commune. The Ruisseau de Marizelle forms the northern border of the commune passing under the canal.

== History ==
In 1836 the commune of Sinceny-Autreville was divided into two parts. The hamlet of Autreville in the former commune became an independent commune.

== Administration ==
List of Successive Mayors of Autreville

From	To	Name	Party
2001	2014	Francis Garcis	DVG
2014	2020	Maryline Alzonne	
2020	2026	Michel Babilotte	
2026	incumbent	El Houssain Driouch	

== Population ==
Historical population
Year	Pop.	±% p.a.
1968	589	—
1975	621	+0.76%
1982	579	−1.00%
1990	749	+3.27%
1999	760	+0.16%
2007	827	+1.06%
2012	826	−0.02%
2017	814	−0.29%
2023	777	−0.77%
Source: INSEE

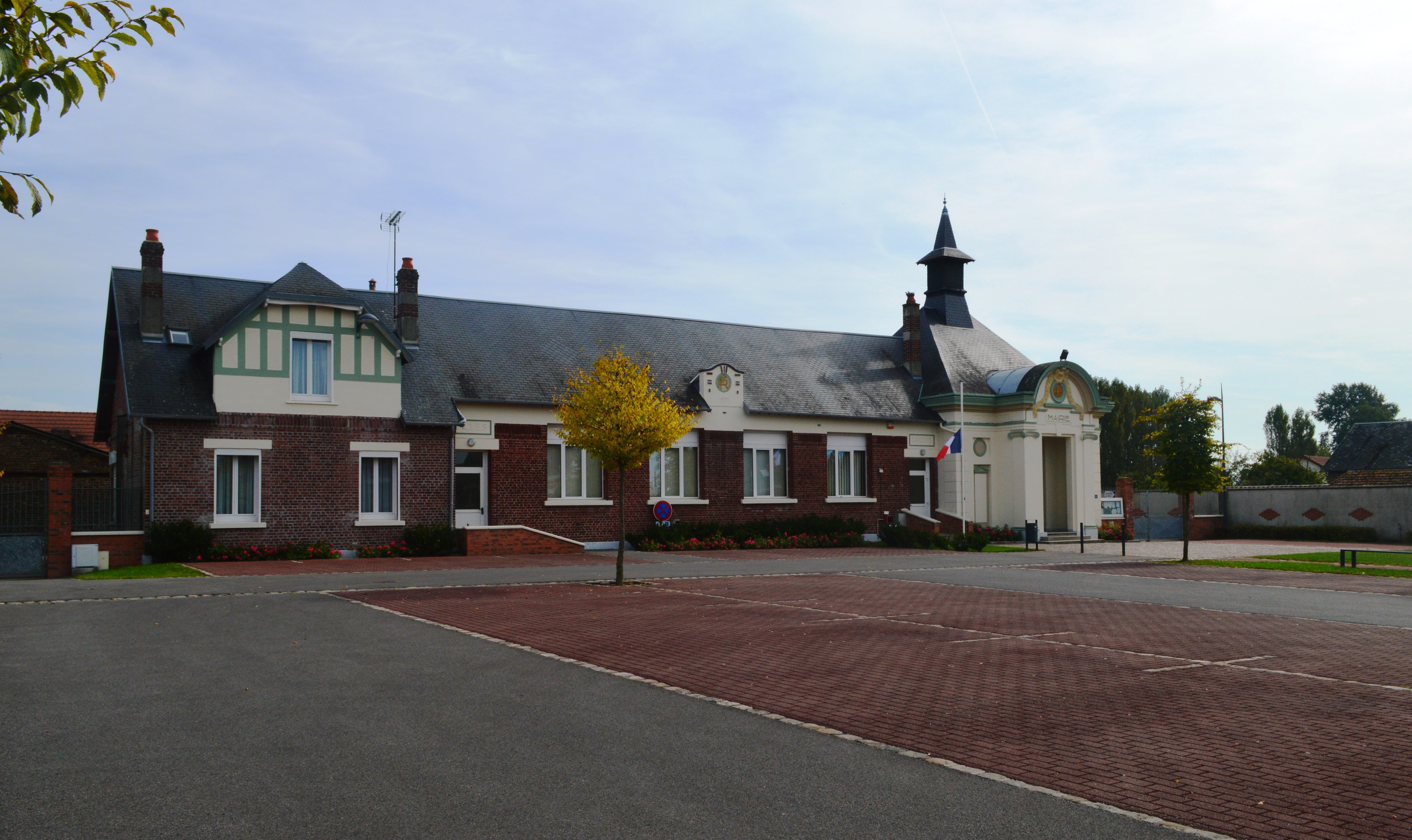
The Town Hall

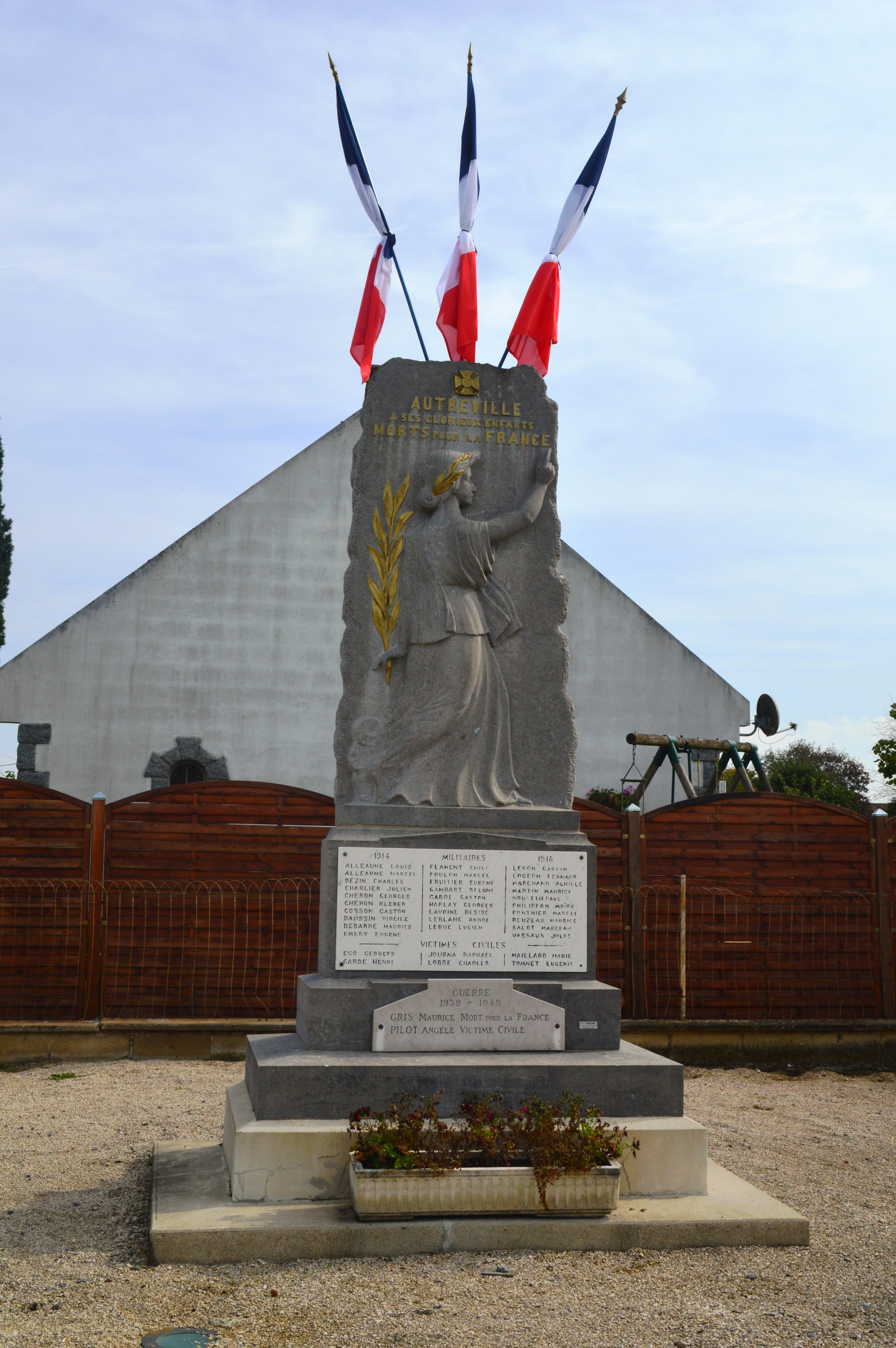
Autreville War Memorial

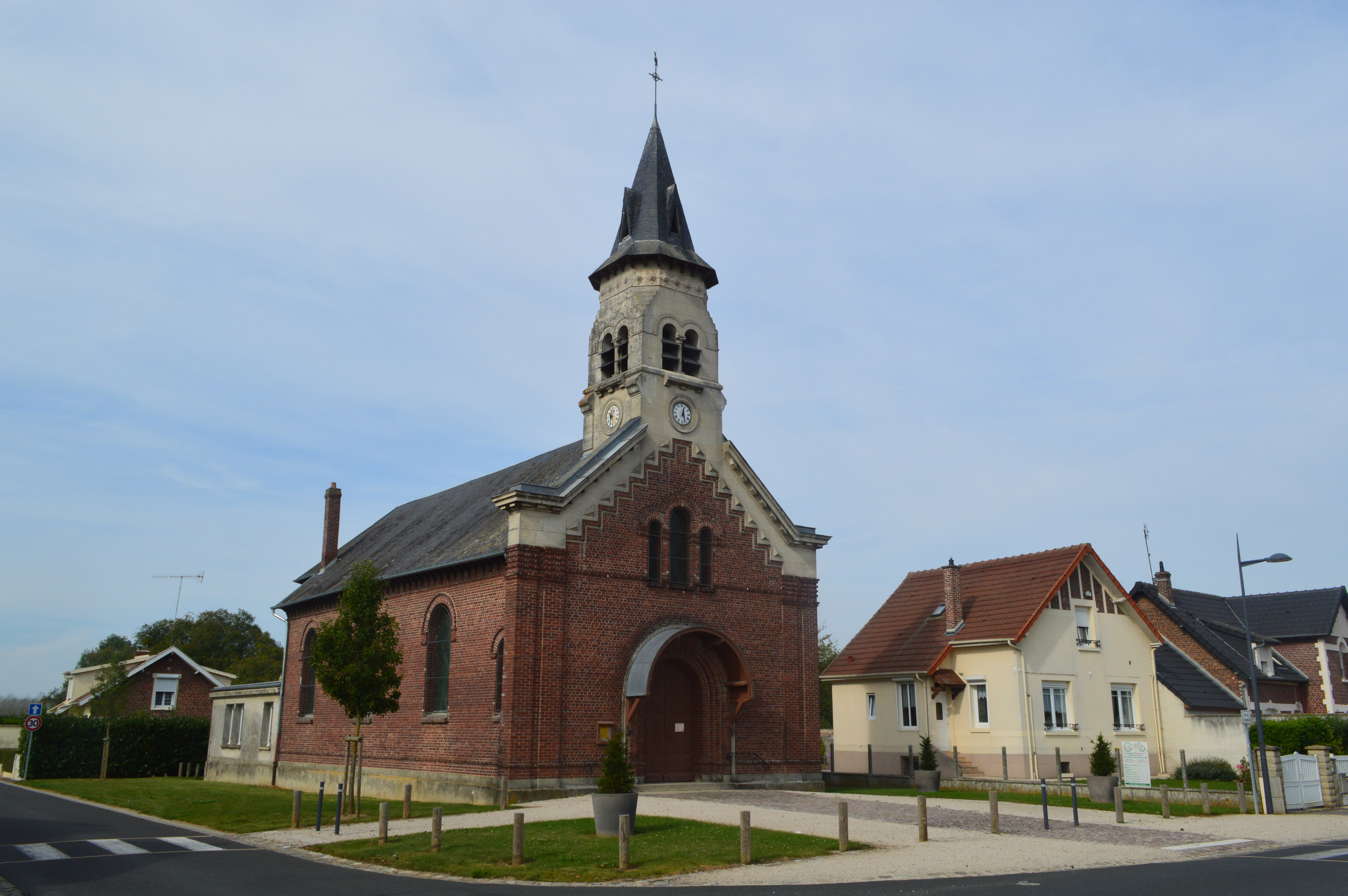
Autreville Church

== See also ==
- Communes of the Aisne department
