= Ognes =

Ognes may refer to the following places in France:

- Ognes, Aisne, a commune in the department of Aisne
- Ognes, Marne, a commune in the department of Marne
- Ognes, Oise, a commune in the department of Oise
