= Commenchon =

- Commune
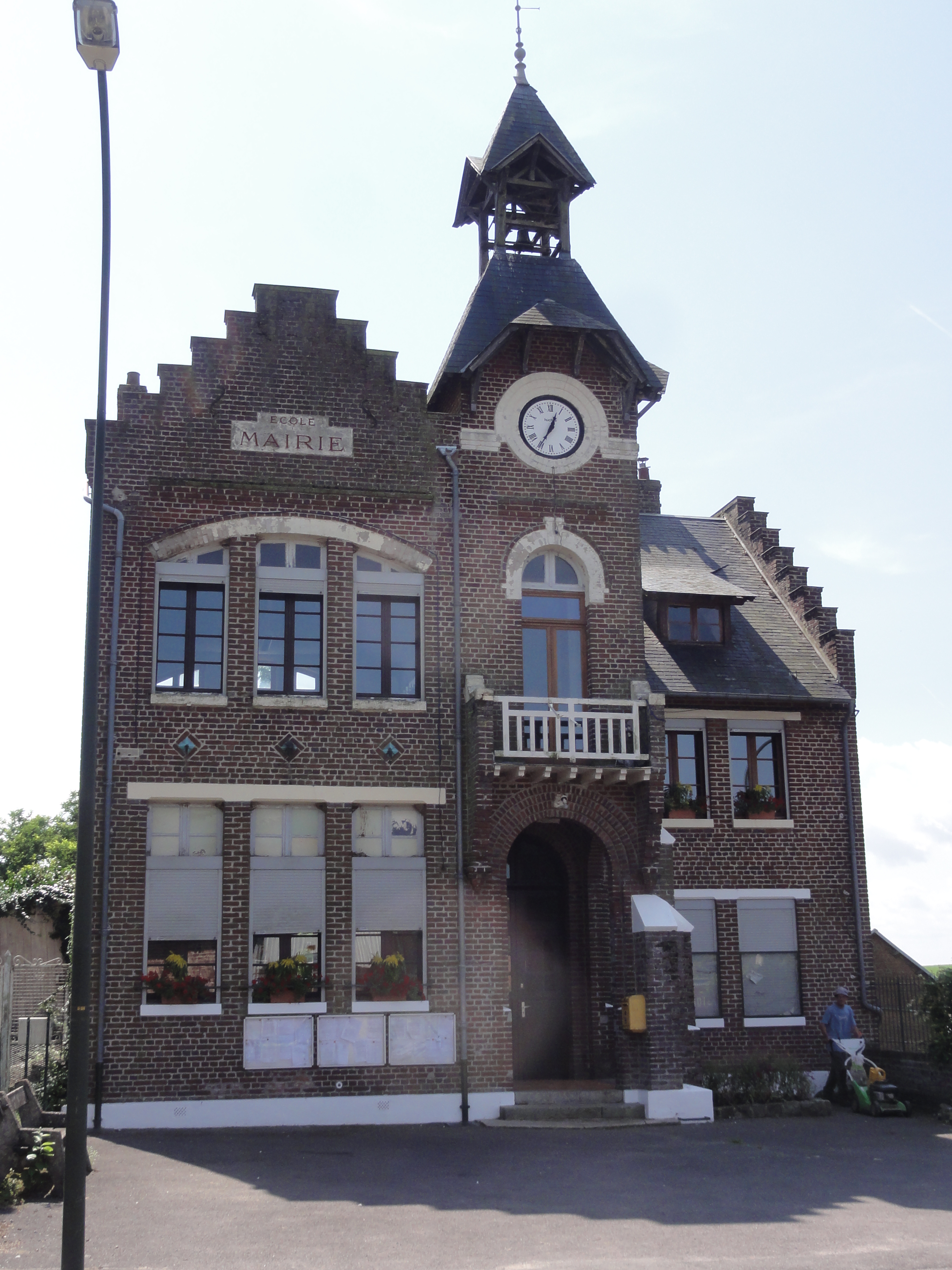
- The town hall and school of Commenchon
- Location of Commenchon
- Location within France Location within Hauts-de-France
- Coordinates: 49°38′28″N 3°09′32″E
- Country: France
- Region: Hauts-de-France
- Department: Aisne
- Arrondissement: Laon
- Canton: Chauny
- Intercommunality: CA Chauny Tergnier La Fère

Government
  - Mayor (2026–32): Arnaud Coquisart
- Area^{1}: 3.33 km^{2} (1.29 sq mi)
- Elevation: 87 m (285 ft)
- Highest elevation: 182 m (597 ft)
- Lowest elevation: 63 m (207 ft)
- Population (2023): 224
  - Density: 67.3/km^{2} (174/sq mi)
- Time zone: UTC+01:00 (CET)
  - Summer (DST): UTC+02:00 (CEST)
- INSEE/Postal code: 02207 /02300
- ^{1} French Land Register data, which excludes lakes, ponds, glaciers > 1 km^{2} (0.386 sq mi or 247 acres) and river estuaries.

Commenchon (French pronunciation: [kɔmɑ̃ʃɔ̃]) is a commune in the Aisne department in Hauts-de-France in northern France.

== Population ==
Historical population
Year	Pop.	±% p.a.
1968	119	—
1975	115	−0.49%
1982	144	+3.26%
1990	160	+1.33%
1999	155	−0.35%
2007	168	+1.01%
2012	207	+4.26%
2017	214	+0.67%
2023	224	+0.76%
Source: INSEE

== See also ==
- Communes of the Aisne department
