= Gordon Flowerdew =

English-born Canadian recipient of the Victoria Cross (1885–1918)

Gordon Flowerdew VC
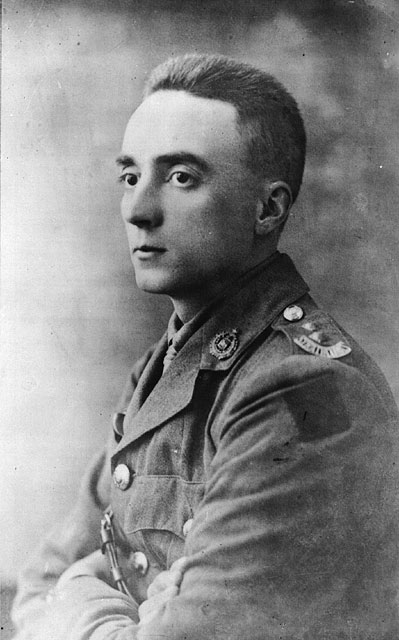
- Born: 2 January 1885; Billingford, Breckland, England
- Died: 31 March 1918 (aged 33); Moreuil, France
- Burial place: Namps-au-Val Cemetery, France
- Military career
- Allegiance: Canada
- Branch: Canadian Expeditionary Force
- Service years: 1914–1918
- Rank: Lieutenant
- Units: Lord Strathcona's Horse
- Commands: C Squadron, Lord Strathcona's Horse
- Conflicts: First World War: Western Front; German spring offensive; Operation Michael; Battle of Moreuil Wood (DOW)
- Awards: Victoria Cross

Gordon Muriel Flowerdew VC (2 January 1885 – 31 March 1918) was an English-born Canadian recipient of the Victoria Cross, the highest and most prestigious award for gallantry in the face of the enemy that can be awarded to British and Commonwealth forces, received for his actions at the Battle of Moreuil Wood.

== Early life ==
He was born in Billingford, Norfolk, one of fourteen children of Arthur John Blomfield Flowerdew and Hannah Flowerdew (nee Symonds). He was educated at Framlingham College in Suffolk, as were all nine of his brothers. At the age of 18, after a bout of pleurisy, he emigrated to British Columbia, where he took up ranching, settling in Walhachin, a community known locally as "little England".

== Military career ==
When the First World War broke out in September 1914, he enlisted as a private in Lord Strathcona's Horse. He rose quickly through the ranks and was commissioned as an officer in 1916. By January 1918, Flowerdew was given command of C Squadron of Lord Strathcona's Horse.

For most of the war, the Canadian Cavalry Brigade was not involved in much direct fighting, because of the static nature of the trench warfare on the Western Front. However, when the Germans launched Operation Michael and began a rapid advance in the spring of 1918, cavalry again became an important factor. In late March, as the Germans approached Moreuil and threatened to cross the L'Avre River, the last natural barrier before Amiens, the Canadian Cavalry Corps was assigned the task of stopping them. As the Germans began to enter Moreuil Wood from the east, Lieutenant Flowerdew's squadron rode around the wood and approached the Germans' flank from the north. Flowerdew's commanding officer, Brigadier General Jack Seely, had ordered a cavalry charge.

Riding into the fire of five infantry companies and an artillery battery, the squadron suffered atrocious casualties (more than half of the men in C Squadron were killed), and Flowerdew himself was fatally wounded. However, the cavalry charge so unnerved the Germans that they did not go on to capture Moreuil Wood, and their advance turned into a retreat in early April. His actions in "The Last Great Cavalry Charge" led to the award of the Victoria Cross. Flowerdew lived long enough to be made aware of the success of the charge. Seely wrote to Flowerdew's sister, referring to "when your brave young brother met his death at the moment of victory to which he had contributed the largest share".

=== Citation ===
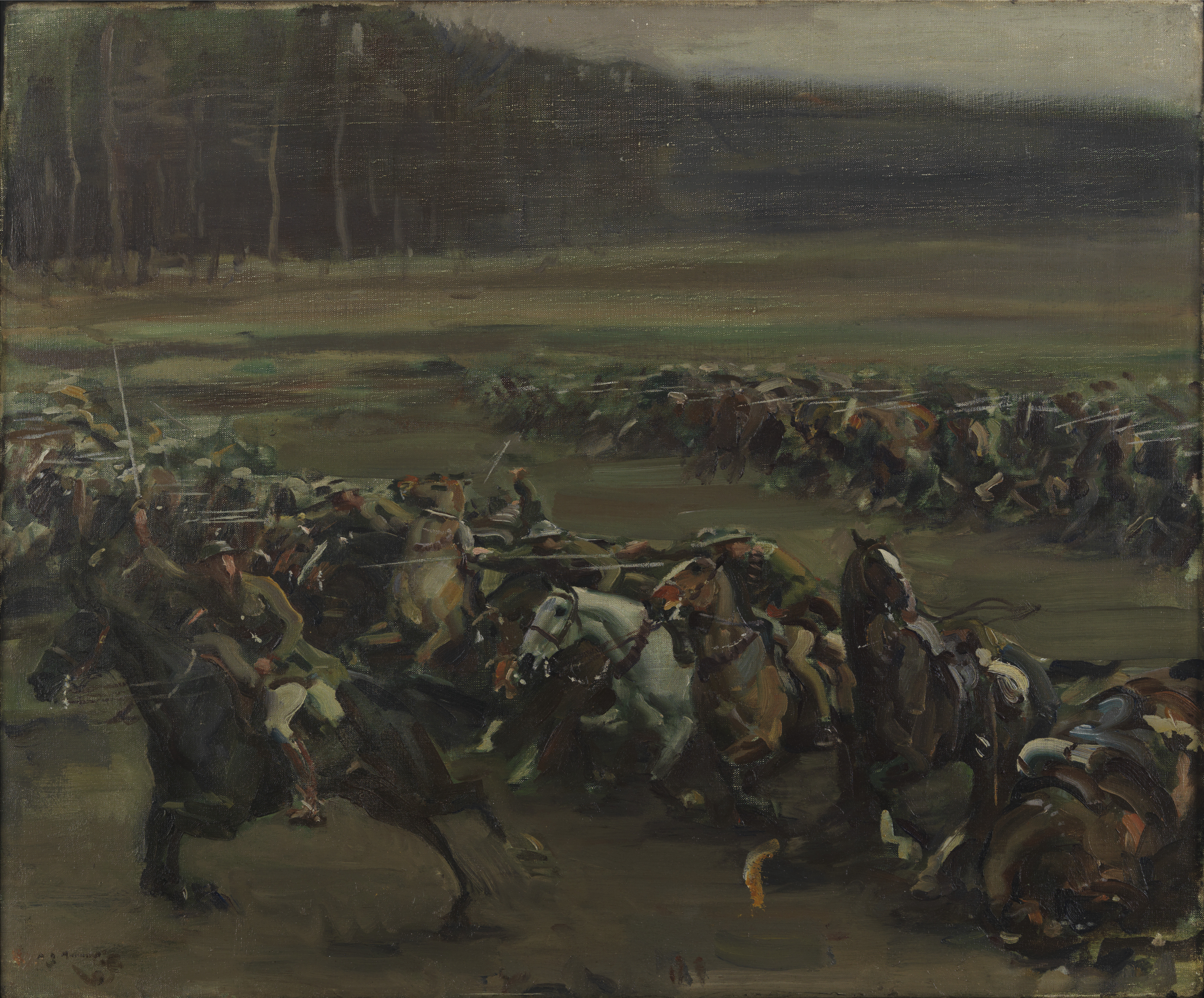
Charge of Flowerdew's Squadron, 1918 by Alfred Munnings, Canadian War Museum

For most conspicuous bravery and dash when in command of a squadron detailed for special services of a very important nature. On reaching his first objective, Lieutenant Flowerdew saw two lines of enemy, each about sixty strong, with machine guns in the centre and flanks; one line being about two hundred yards behind the other. Realizing the critical nature of the operation and how much depended on it, Lieut. Flowerdew ordered a troop under Lieut. Harvey, VC, to dismount and carry out a special movement, while he led the remaining three troops to the charge. The squadron (less one troop) passed over both lines, killing many of the enemy with the sword; and wheeling about galloping on them again. Although the squadron had then lost about 70 per cent of its members, killed and wounded from rifle and machine gun fire directed on it from the front and both flanks, the enemy broke and retired. The survivors of the squadron then established themselves in a position where they were joined, after much hand-to-hand fighting, by Lieut. Harvey's part. Lieut. Flowerdew was dangerously wounded through both thighs during the operation, but continued to cheer his men. There can be no doubt that this officer's great valour was the prime factor in the capture of the position.

Flowerdew's VC was one of twenty awarded during the battles of the German and Allied offensives in the Amiens area in 1918.

Alfred Munnings, who was then a largely unknown war artist, created an oil painting Charge of Flowerdew's Squadron which depicts this cavalry charge. The canvas was formerly at the Imperial War Museum in London; it is now in the collection of the Canadian War Museum in Ottawa.

Flowerdew is buried at Namps-au-Val Cemetery in France located 11 miles south-east of Amiens (plot I, row H. grave 1).

== Legacy ==
His posthumously awarded VC was donated by his mother to Framlingham College in England. It had been on loan to, and displayed by, Lord Strathcona's Horse (Royal Canadians) at their gallery in The Military Museums in Calgary, Alberta, from 1990 to 2002. The medal was returned to the college in 2002, returning to be displayed on the 2018 Moreuil Wood Military Parade and commemoration.

Lieutenant Flowerdew is a character in the play Mary's Wedding, by Canadian playwright Stephen Massicotte. The climax of the play takes place during the charge at Moreuil Wood.

== See also ==
- Horses in World War I
