= Viry-Noureuil =

- Commune
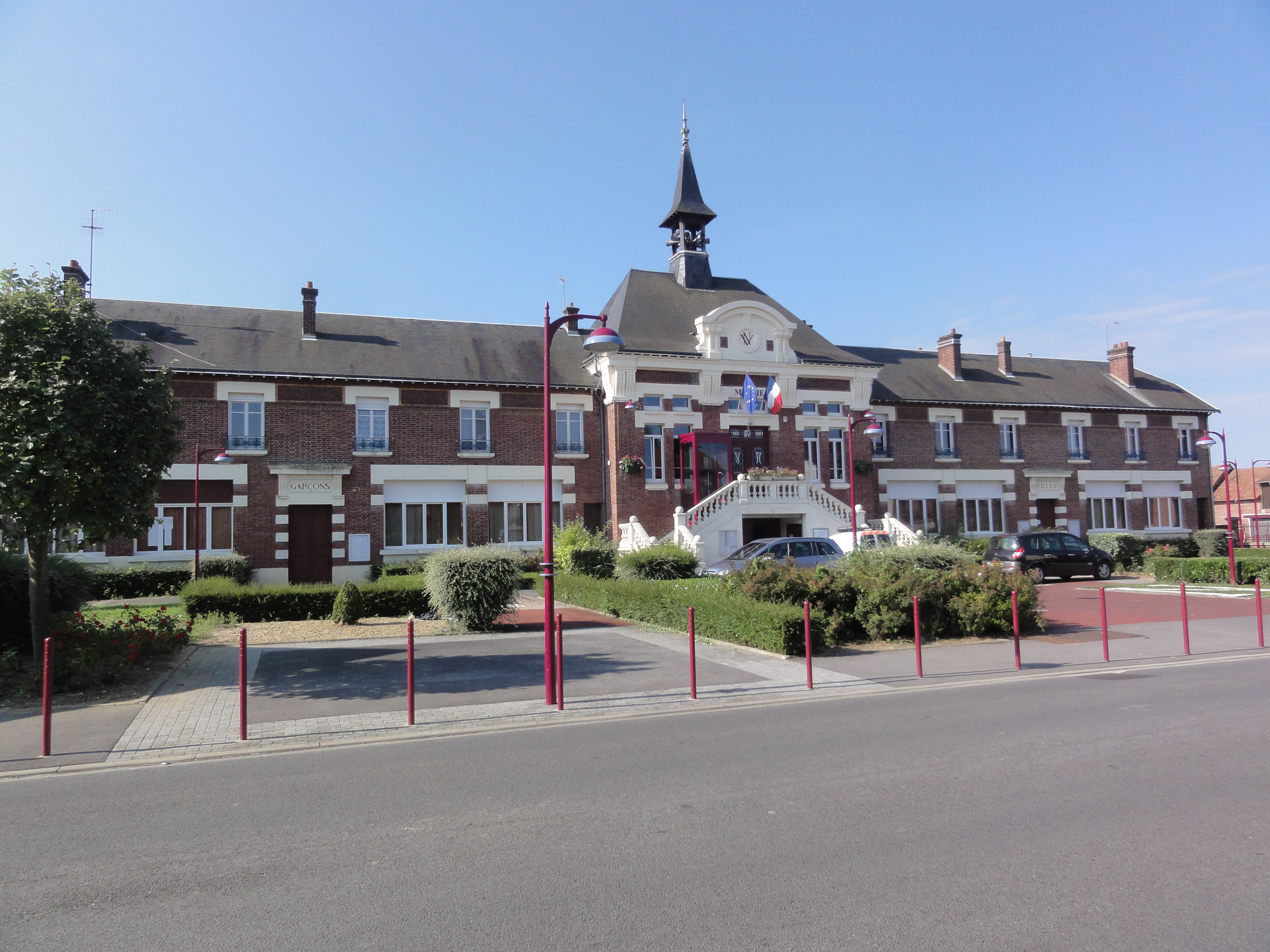
- The town hall and school of Viry-Noureuil

- Coat of arms
- Location of Viry-Noureuil
- Location within France Location within Hauts-de-France
- Coordinates: 49°37′56″N 3°14′37″E
- Country: France
- Region: Hauts-de-France
- Department: Aisne
- Arrondissement: Laon
- Canton: Chauny
- Intercommunality: CA Chauny Tergnier La Fère

Government
  - Mayor (2026–32): Jean Farez
- Area^{1}: 17.76 km^{2} (6.86 sq mi)
- Elevation: 53 m (174 ft)
- Highest elevation: 107 m (351 ft)
- Lowest elevation: 42 m (138 ft)
- Population (2023): 1,651
  - Density: 92.96/km^{2} (240.8/sq mi)
- Time zone: UTC+01:00 (CET)
  - Summer (DST): UTC+02:00 (CEST)
- INSEE/Postal code: 02820 /02300
- ^{1} French Land Register data, which excludes lakes, ponds, glaciers > 1 km^{2} (0.386 sq mi or 247 acres) and river estuaries.

Viry-Noureuil (French pronunciation: [viʁi nuʁœj]) is a commune in the Aisne department in Hauts-de-France in northern France.

== Population ==
Historical population
| Year | Pop. | ±% p.a. |
|---|---|---|
| 1968 | 1,379 | — |
| 1975 | 1,441 | +0.63% |
| 1982 | 1,674 | +2.16% |
| 1990 | 1,839 | +1.18% |
| 1999 | 1,843 | +0.02% |
| 2007 | 1,913 | +0.47% |
| 2012 | 1,785 | −1.38% |
| 2017 | 1,695 | −1.03% |
| 2023 | 1,651 | −0.44% |
Source: INSEE

== See also ==
- Communes of the Aisne department
