= Béthancourt-en-Vaux =

- Commune
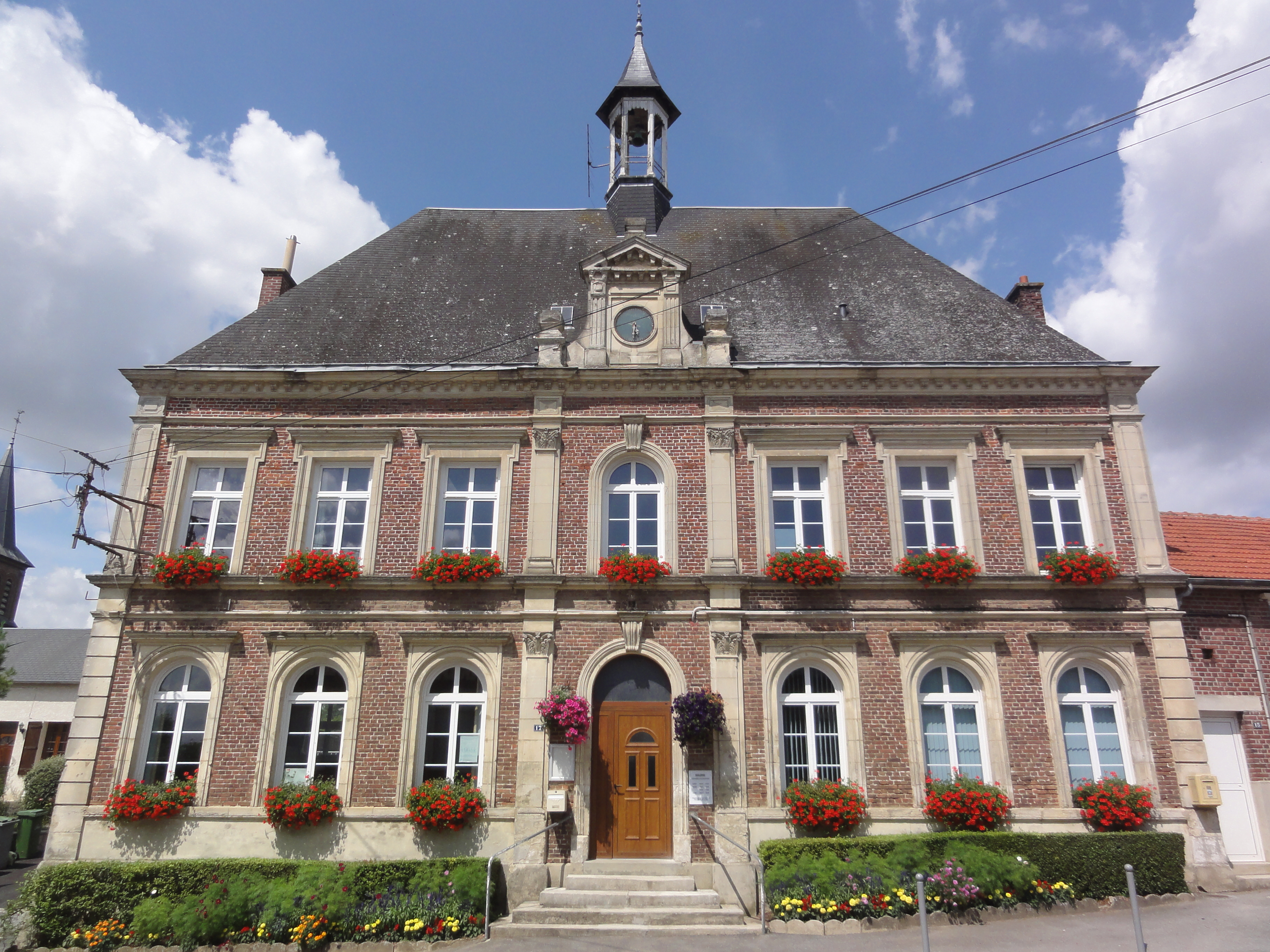
- Town hall
- Location of Béthancourt-en-Vaux
- Location within France Location within Hauts-de-France
- Coordinates: 49°37′46″N 3°08′54″E
- Country: France
- Region: Hauts-de-France
- Department: Aisne
- Arrondissement: Laon
- Canton: Chauny
- Intercommunality: CA Chauny Tergnier La Fère

Government
  - Mayor (2026–32): Alain Servais
- Area^{1}: 4.3 km^{2} (1.7 sq mi)
- Highest elevation: 172 m (564 ft)
- Lowest elevation: 58 m (190 ft)
- Population (2023): 421
  - Density: 98/km^{2} (250/sq mi)
- Time zone: UTC+01:00 (CET)
  - Summer (DST): UTC+02:00 (CEST)
- INSEE/Postal code: 02081 /02300
- ^{1} French Land Register data, which excludes lakes, ponds, glaciers > 1 km^{2} (0.386 sq mi or 247 acres) and river estuaries.

Béthancourt-en-Vaux (French pronunciation: [betɑ̃kuʁ ɑ̃ vo]) is a commune in the department of Aisne in Hauts-de-France in northern France.

== Population ==
Historical population
Year	Pop.	±% p.a.
1968	327	—
1975	301	−1.18%
1982	371	+3.03%
1990	353	−0.62%
1999	368	+0.46%
2007	386	+0.60%
2012	474	+4.19%
2017	440	−1.48%
2023	421	−0.73%
Source: INSEE

== See also ==
- Communes of the Aisne department
