= Caumont, Aisne =

Caumont
- Commune
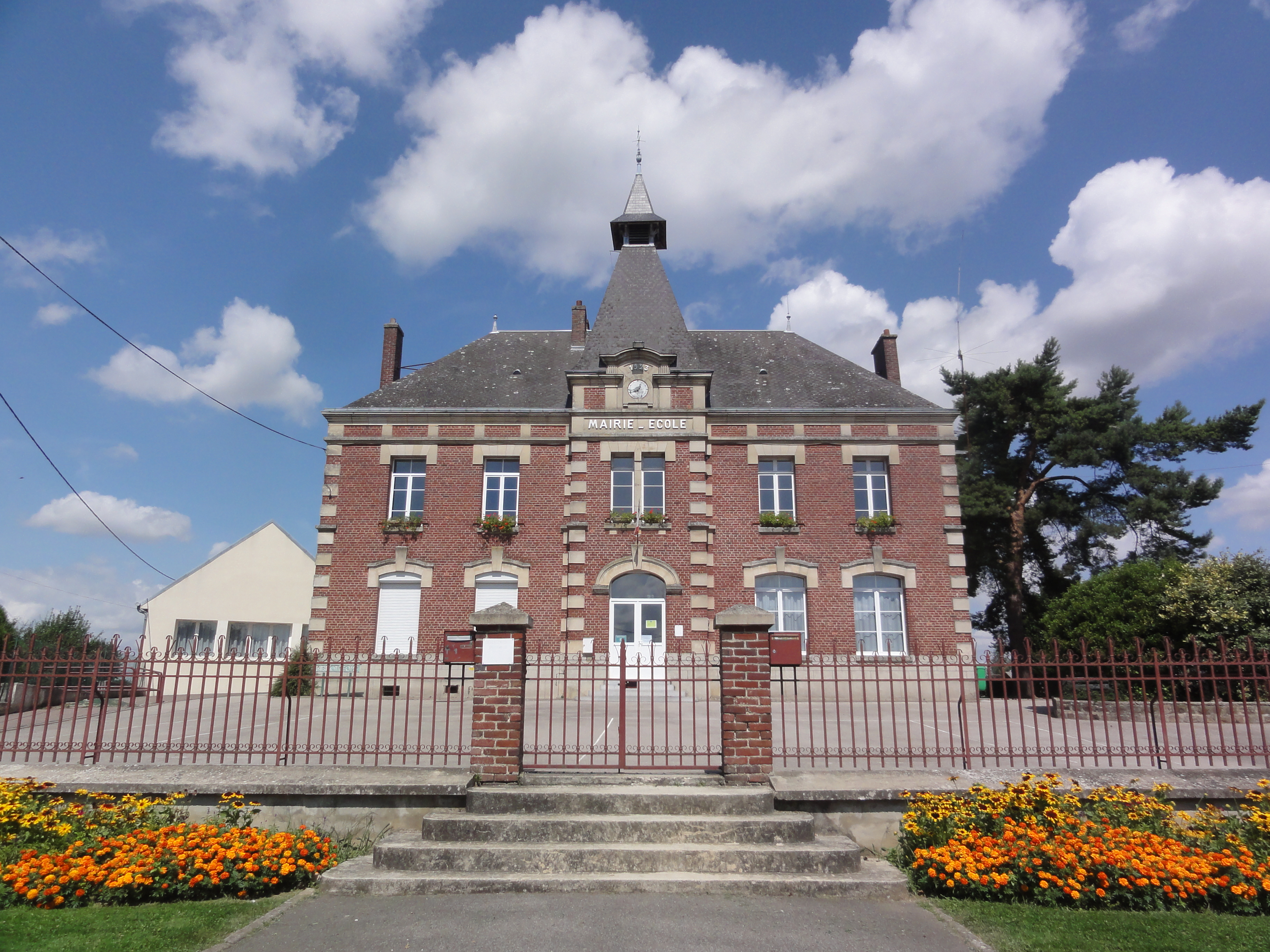
- The town hall and school of Caumont
- Location of Caumont
- Location within France Location within Hauts-de-France
- Coordinates: 49°37′57″N 3°10′42″E
- Country: France
- Region: Hauts-de-France
- Department: Aisne
- Arrondissement: Laon
- Canton: Chauny
- Intercommunality: CA Chauny Tergnier La Fère

Government
  - Mayor (2026–32): Sylvain Lewandowski
- Area^{1}: 5.71 km^{2} (2.20 sq mi)
- Elevation: 90 m (300 ft)
- Highest elevation: 156 m (512 ft)
- Lowest elevation: 56 m (184 ft)
- Population (2023): 547
  - Density: 95.8/km^{2} (248/sq mi)
- Time zone: UTC+01:00 (CET)
  - Summer (DST): UTC+02:00 (CEST)
- INSEE/Postal code: 02145 /02300
- ^{1} French Land Register data, which excludes lakes, ponds, glaciers > 1 km^{2} (0.386 sq mi or 247 acres) and river estuaries.

Caumont (French pronunciation: [komɔ̃]) is a commune in the Aisne department in Hauts-de-France in northern France.

== Population ==
Historical population
Year	Pop.	±% p.a.
1968	252	—
1975	257	+0.28%
1982	371	+5.38%
1990	482	+3.33%
1999	474	−0.19%
2007	563	+2.17%
2012	575	+0.42%
2017	546	−1.03%
2023	547	+0.03%
Source: INSEE

== See also ==
- Communes of the Aisne department
