= Neuflieux =

- Commune
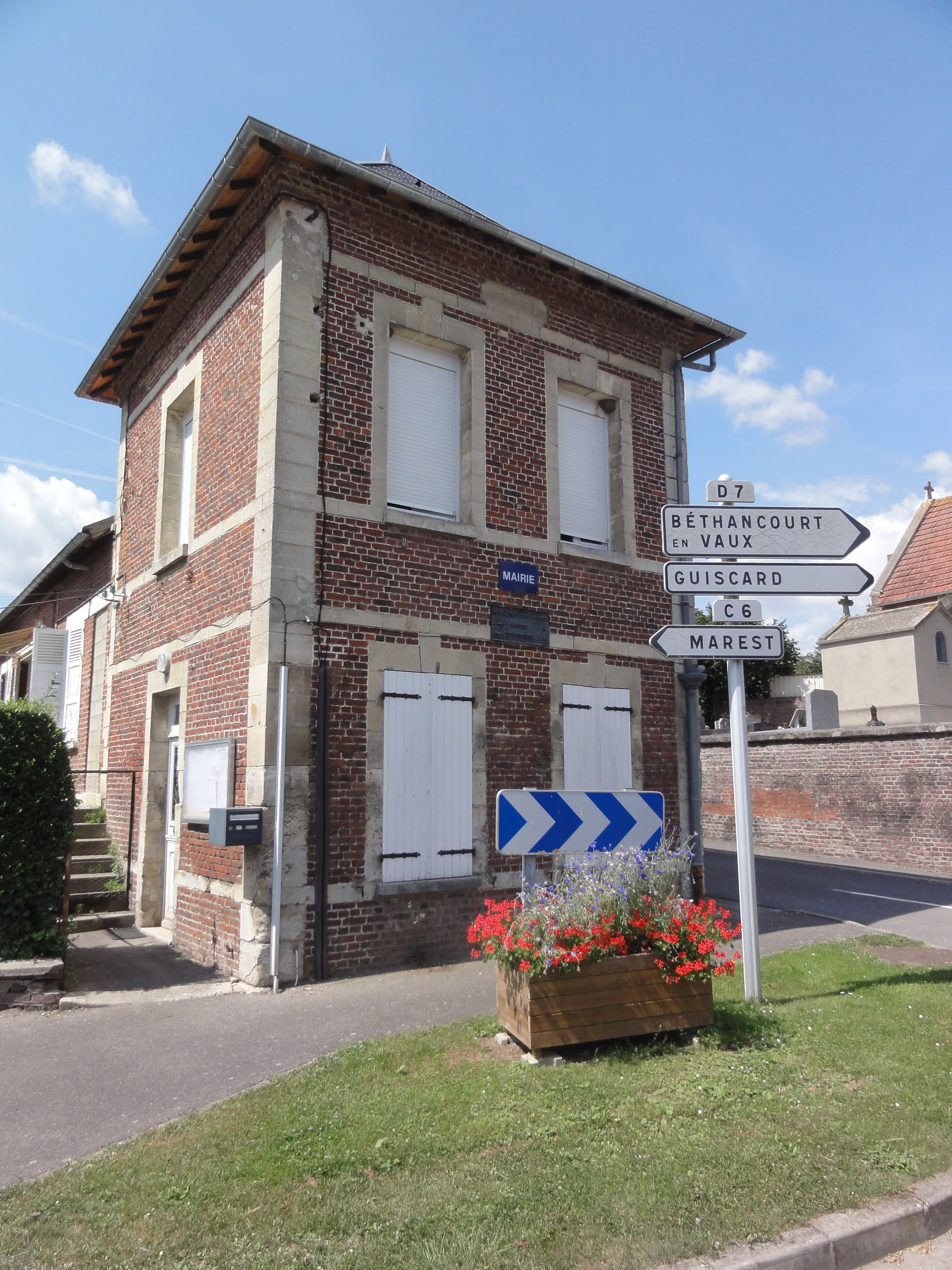
- The town hall of Neuflieux
- Location of Neuflieux
- Location within France Location within Hauts-de-France
- Coordinates: 49°37′14″N 3°09′42″E
- Country: France
- Region: Hauts-de-France
- Department: Aisne
- Arrondissement: Laon
- Canton: Chauny
- Intercommunality: CA Chauny Tergnier La Fère

Government
  - Mayor (2026–32): Bruno Fremaux
- Area^{1}: 1.9 km^{2} (0.73 sq mi)
- Elevation: 85 m (279 ft)
- Highest elevation: 96 m (315 ft)
- Lowest elevation: 54 m (177 ft)
- Population (2023): 80
  - Density: 42/km^{2} (110/sq mi)
- Time zone: UTC+01:00 (CET)
  - Summer (DST): UTC+02:00 (CEST)
- INSEE/Postal code: 02542 /02300
- ^{1} French Land Register data, which excludes lakes, ponds, glaciers > 1 km^{2} (0.386 sq mi or 247 acres) and river estuaries.

Neuflieux is a commune in the Aisne department in Hauts-de-France in northern France.

== Population ==
Historical population
Year	Pop.	±% p.a.
1968	75	—
1975	58	−3.61%
1982	79	+4.51%
1990	93	+2.06%
1999	92	−0.12%
2007	91	−0.14%
2012	96	+1.08%
2017	91	−1.06%
2023	80	−2.12%
Source: INSEE

== See also ==
- Communes of the Aisne department
