= Canton of Chauny =

Coordinates: 49°37′N 3°13′E

Chauny
- Canton
- Interactive map of Chauny
- Country: France
- Region: Hauts-de-France
- Department: Aisne
- No. of communes: {{{nbcomm}}}
- Area: 166.14 km^{2} (64.15 sq mi)
- Population (2023): 23,804
  - Density: 143.28/km^{2} (371.09/sq mi)
- INSEE code: 02 03

The canton of Chauny is an administrative division in northern France. At the French canton reorganisation which came into effect in March 2015, the canton was expanded from 20 to 21 communes:

1. Abbécourt
2. Amigny-Rouy
3. Autreville
4. Beaumont-en-Beine
5. Béthancourt-en-Vaux
6. Caillouël-Crépigny
7. Caumont
8. Chauny
9. Commenchon
10. Condren
11. Frières-Faillouël
12. Guivry
13. Marest-Dampcourt
14. Neuflieux
15. La Neuville-en-Beine
16. Ognes
17. Pierremande
18. Sinceny
19. Ugny-le-Gay
20. Villequier-Aumont
21. Viry-Noureuil

== Demographics ==
Historical population
Year	Pop.	±% p.a.
2013	24,531	—
2018	24,170	−0.30%
Source: INSEE

== See also ==
- Cantons of the Aisne department
- Communes of France
