= Marest-Dampcourt =

- Commune
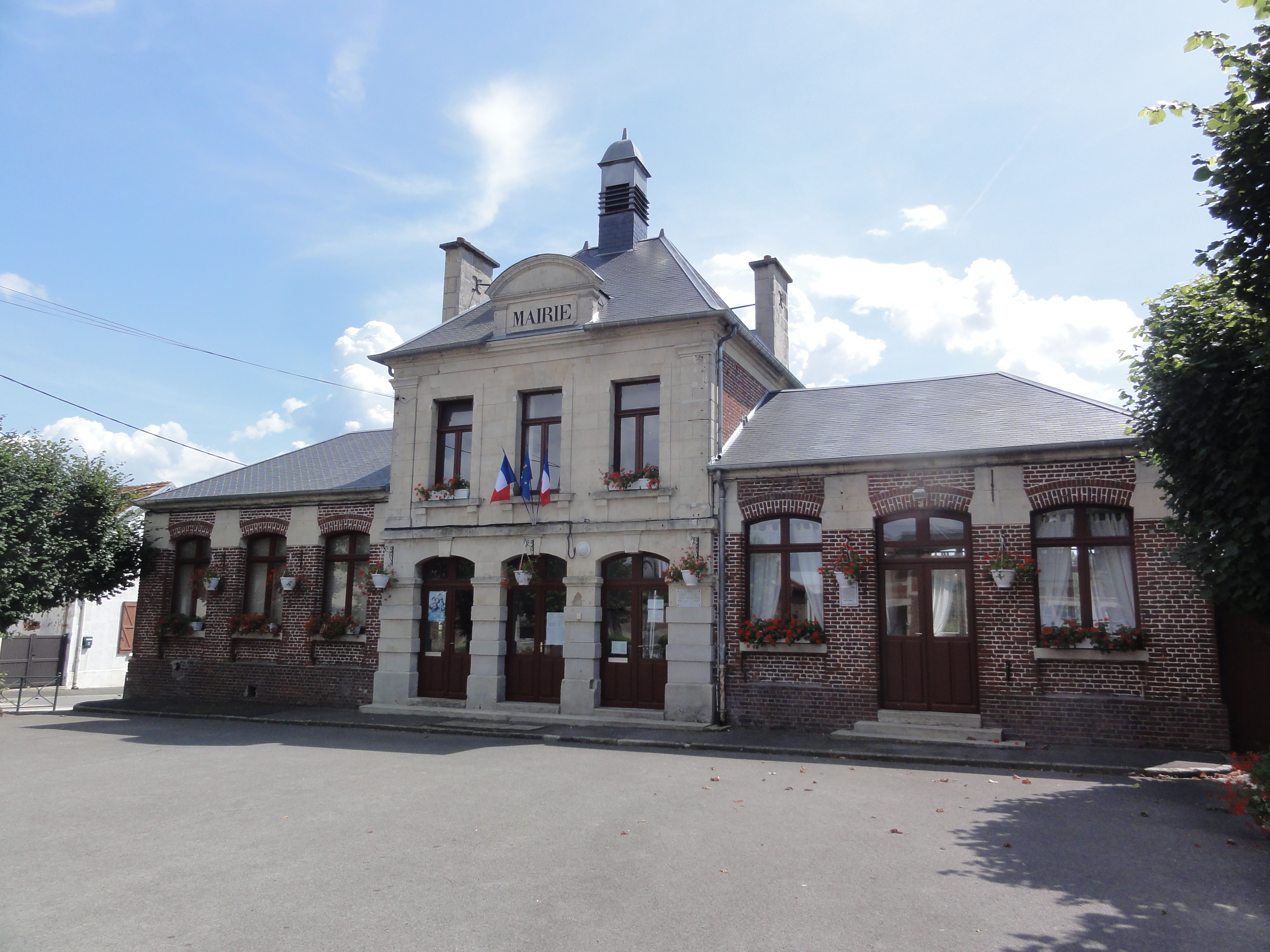
- The town hall of Marest
- Location of Marest-Dampcourt
- Location within France Location within Hauts-de-France
- Coordinates: 49°36′03″N 3°09′08″E
- Country: France
- Region: Hauts-de-France
- Department: Aisne
- Arrondissement: Laon
- Canton: Chauny
- Intercommunality: CA Chauny Tergnier La Fère

Government
  - Mayor (2026–32): Henri Magnier
- Area^{1}: 8.35 km^{2} (3.22 sq mi)
- Elevation: 57 m (187 ft)
- Highest elevation: 63 m (207 ft)
- Lowest elevation: 38 m (125 ft)
- Population (2023): 341
  - Density: 40.8/km^{2} (106/sq mi)
- Time zone: UTC+01:00 (CET)
  - Summer (DST): UTC+02:00 (CEST)
- INSEE/Postal code: 02461 /02300
- ^{1} French Land Register data, which excludes lakes, ponds, glaciers > 1 km^{2} (0.386 sq mi or 247 acres) and river estuaries.

Marest-Dampcourt is a commune in the Aisne department in Hauts-de-France in northern France.

== Population ==
Historical population
| Year | Pop. | ±% p.a. |
|---|---|---|
| 1968 | 339 | — |
| 1975 | 328 | −0.47% |
| 1982 | 349 | +0.89% |
| 1990 | 340 | −0.33% |
| 1999 | 326 | −0.47% |
| 2007 | 329 | +0.11% |
| 2012 | 347 | +1.07% |
| 2017 | 369 | +1.24% |
| 2023 | 341 | −1.31% |
Source: INSEE

== See also ==
- Communes of the Aisne department
