= Pierremande =

- Commune
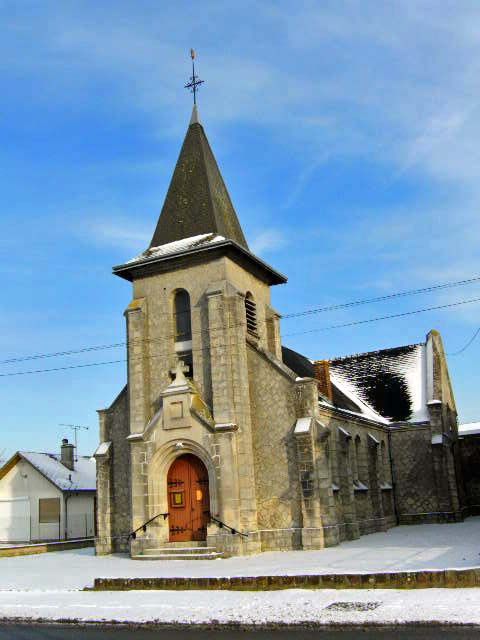
- The church of Pierremande
- Location of Pierremande
- Location within France Location within Hauts-de-France
- Coordinates: 49°34′20″N 3°15′04″E
- Country: France
- Region: Hauts-de-France
- Department: Aisne
- Arrondissement: Laon
- Canton: Chauny
- Intercommunality: CA Chauny Tergnier La Fère

Government
  - Mayor (2026–32): Patrice Henninot
- Area^{1}: 7.57 km^{2} (2.92 sq mi)
- Elevation: 67 m (220 ft)
- Highest elevation: 80 m (260 ft)
- Lowest elevation: 42 m (138 ft)
- Population (2023): 250
  - Density: 33/km^{2} (86/sq mi)
- Time zone: UTC+01:00 (CET)
  - Summer (DST): UTC+02:00 (CEST)
- INSEE/Postal code: 02599 /02300
- ^{1} French Land Register data, which excludes lakes, ponds, glaciers > 1 km^{2} (0.386 sq mi or 247 acres) and river estuaries.

Pierremande (French pronunciation: [pjɛʁmɑ̃d]) is a commune in the Aisne department in Hauts-de-France in northern France.

== Geography ==
The river Ailette forms part of the commune's southern border.

== Population ==
Historical population
Year	Pop.	±% p.a.
1968	274	—
1975	270	−0.21%
1982	278	+0.42%
1990	261	−0.79%
1999	260	−0.04%
2007	281	+0.98%
2012	265	−1.17%
2017	279	+1.03%
2023	250	−1.81%
Source: INSEE

== See also ==
- Communes of the Aisne department
