= Ugny-le-Gay =

- Commune
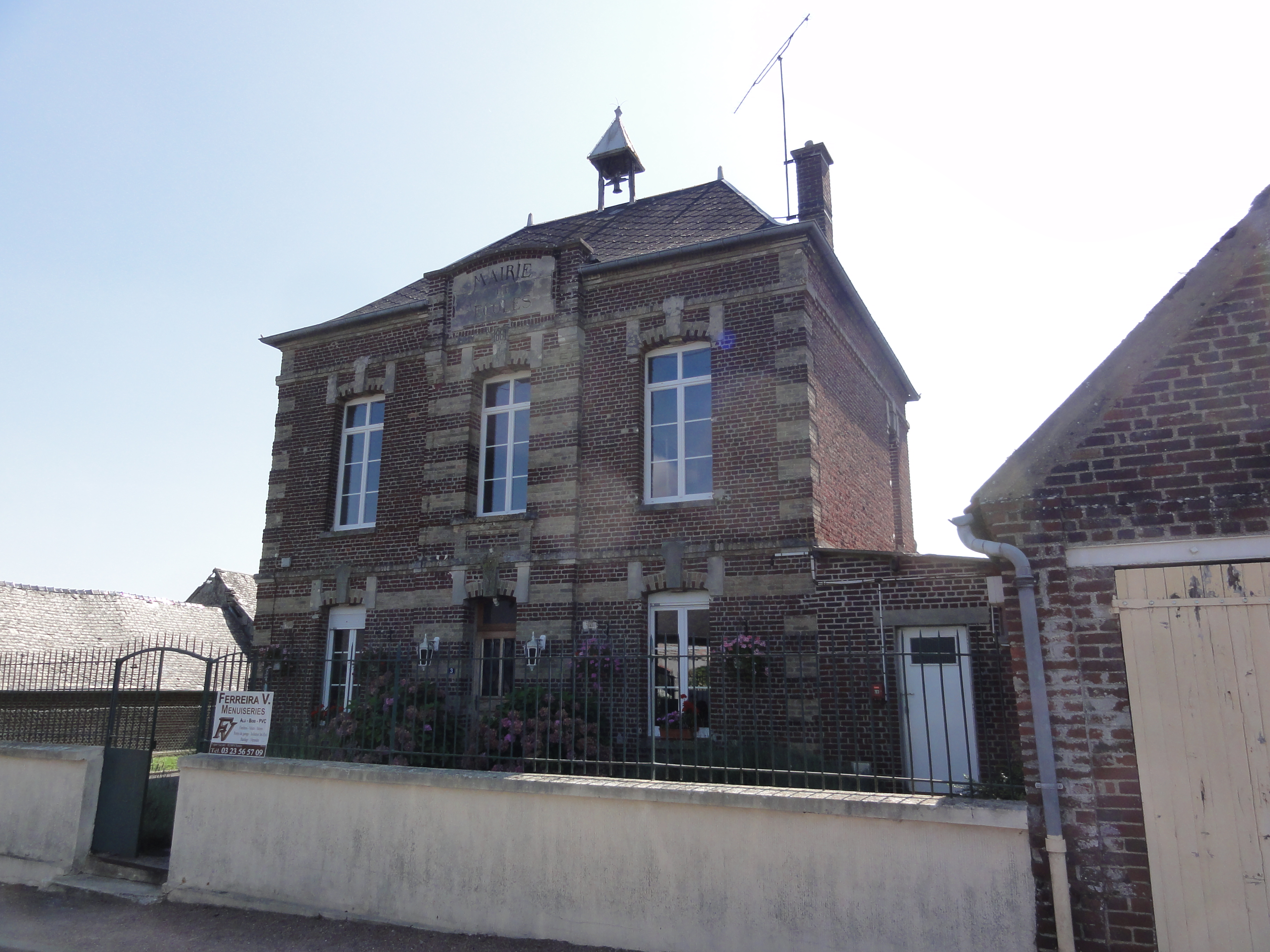
- The town hall and school of Ugny-le-Gay
- Location of Ugny-le-Gay
- Location within France Location within Hauts-de-France
- Coordinates: 49°39′38″N 3°09′39″E
- Country: France
- Region: Hauts-de-France
- Department: Aisne
- Arrondissement: Laon
- Canton: Chauny
- Intercommunality: CA Chauny Tergnier La Fère

Government
  - Mayor (2026–32): Sylvie Lelong
- Area^{1}: 5.9 km^{2} (2.3 sq mi)
- Elevation: 90 m (300 ft)
- Highest elevation: 169 m (554 ft)
- Lowest elevation: 66 m (217 ft)
- Population (2023): 187
  - Density: 32/km^{2} (82/sq mi)
- Time zone: UTC+01:00 (CET)
  - Summer (DST): UTC+02:00 (CEST)
- INSEE/Postal code: 02754 /02300
- ^{1} French Land Register data, which excludes lakes, ponds, glaciers > 1 km^{2} (0.386 sq mi or 247 acres) and river estuaries.

Ugny-le-Gay (French pronunciation: [yɲi lə ɡɛ]) is a commune in the Aisne department in Hauts-de-France in northern France.

== Geography ==
Ugny-le-Gay covers an area of approximately 5.9 square kilometers, with elevations ranging from 66 meters to 169 meters above sea level. It is situated about 35 kilometers from Laon, the department capital, and approximately 107 kilometers from Paris.

== Population ==
Historical population
Year	Pop.	±% p.a.
1968	215	—
1975	196	−1.31%
1982	172	−1.85%
1990	148	−1.86%
1999	166	+1.28%
2007	157	−0.69%
2012	170	+1.60%
2017	182	+1.37%
2023	187	+0.45%
Source: INSEE

== See also ==
- Communes of the Aisne department
