= Guivry =

- Commune
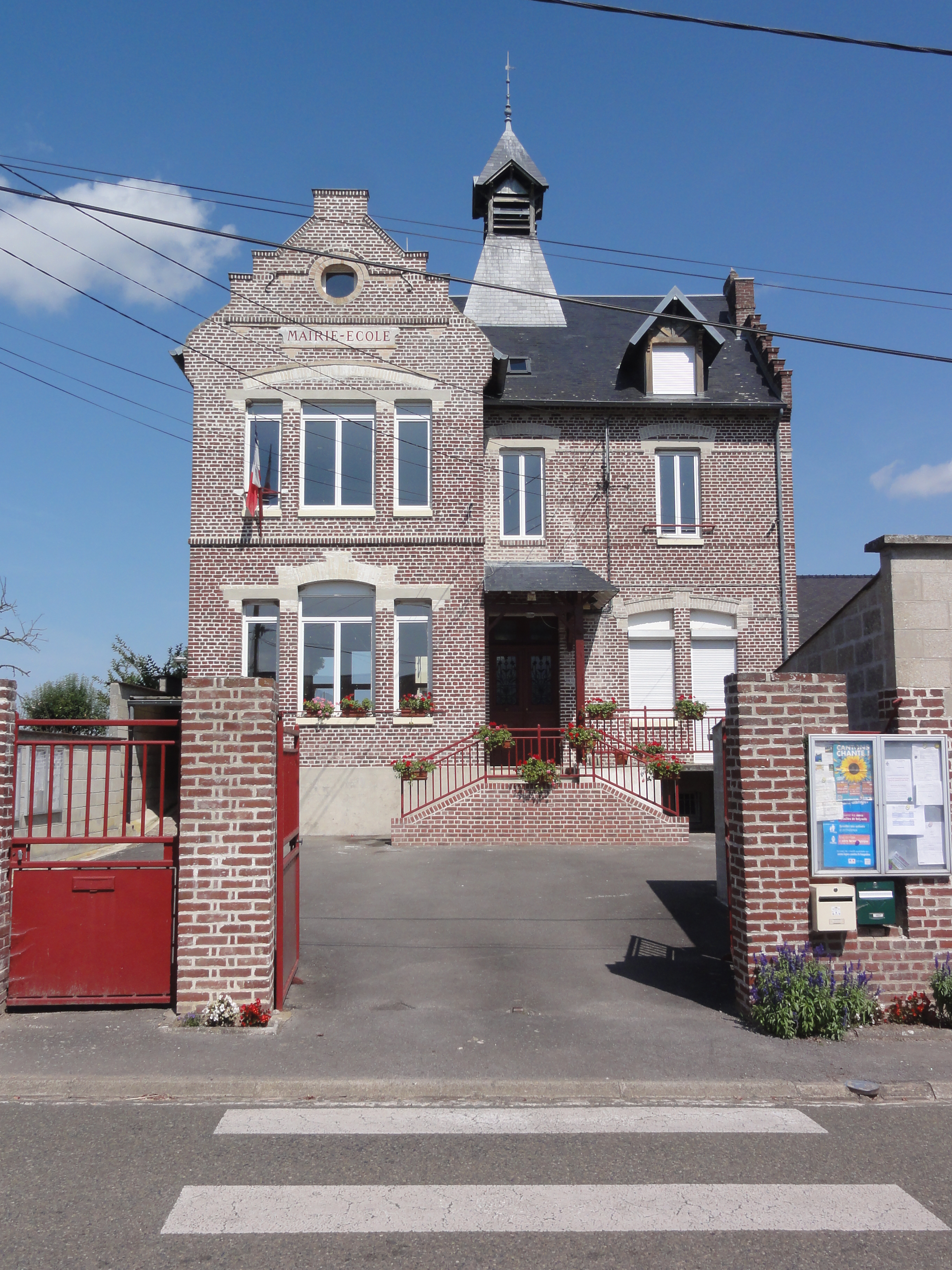
- The town hall and school of Guivry

- Coat of arms
- Location of Guivry
- Location within France Location within Hauts-de-France
- Coordinates: 49°38′50″N 3°07′12″E
- Country: France
- Region: Hauts-de-France
- Department: Aisne
- Arrondissement: Laon
- Canton: Chauny
- Intercommunality: CA Chauny Tergnier La Fère

Government
  - Mayor (2026–32): Joël Pestel
- Area^{1}: 7.15 km^{2} (2.76 sq mi)
- Elevation: 140 m (460 ft)
- Highest elevation: 180 m (590 ft)
- Lowest elevation: 73 m (240 ft)
- Population (2023): 238
  - Density: 33.3/km^{2} (86.2/sq mi)
- Time zone: UTC+01:00 (CET)
  - Summer (DST): UTC+02:00 (CEST)
- INSEE/Postal code: 02362 /02300
- ^{1} French Land Register data, which excludes lakes, ponds, glaciers > 1 km^{2} (0.386 sq mi or 247 acres) and river estuaries.

Guivry (French pronunciation: [ɡivʁi]) is a commune in the Aisne department in Hauts-de-France in northern France.

== Population ==
Historical population
Year	Pop.	±% p.a.
1968	250	—
1975	221	−1.75%
1982	235	+0.88%
1990	229	−0.32%
1999	221	−0.39%
2007	254	+1.75%
2012	263	+0.70%
2017	243	−1.57%
2023	238	−0.35%
Source: INSEE

== See also ==
- Communes of the Aisne department
