= La Neuville-en-Beine =

- Commune
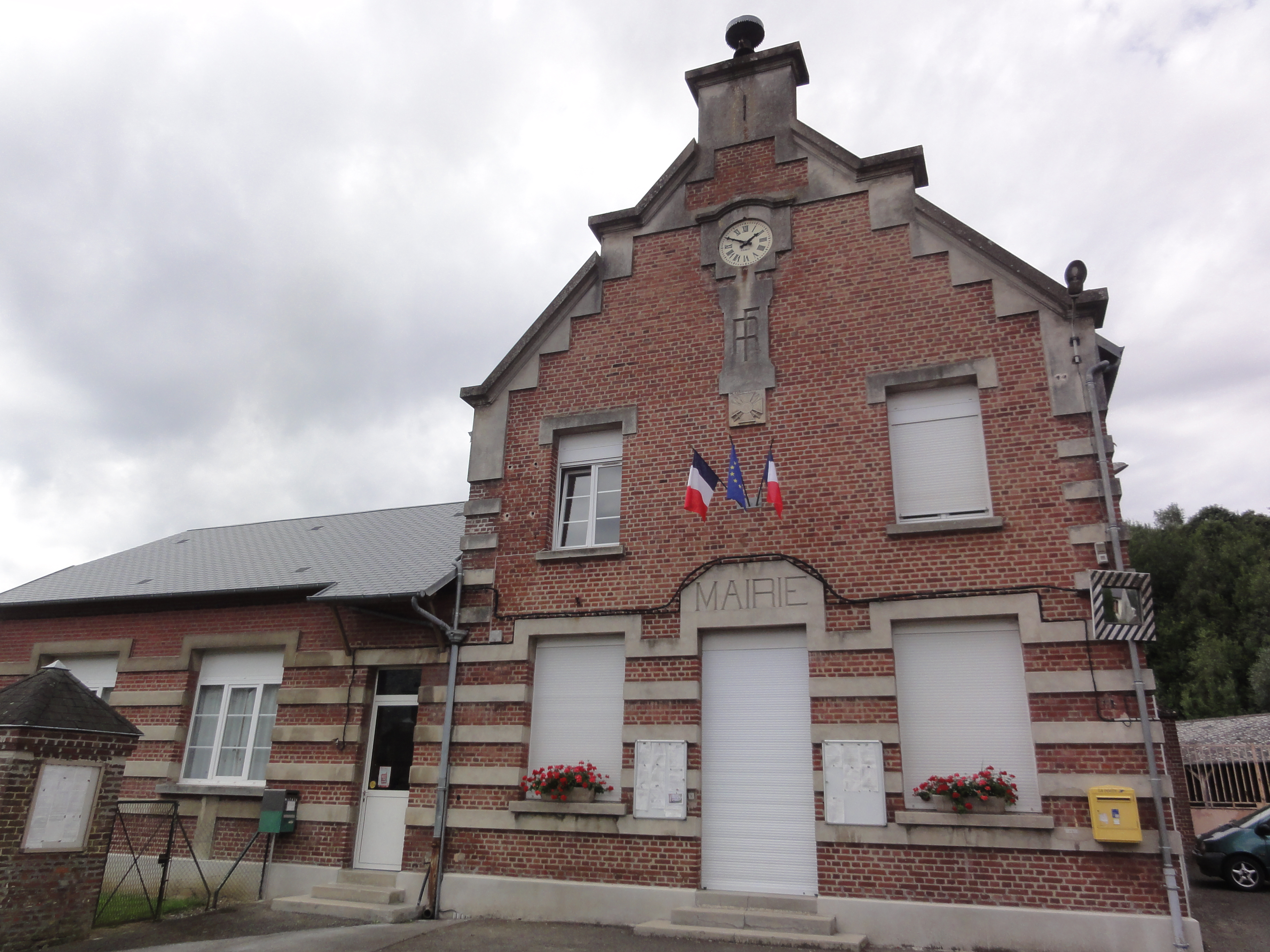
- The town hall of La Neuville-en-Beine
- Location of La Neuville-en-Beine
- Location within France Location within Hauts-de-France
- Coordinates: 49°40′35″N 3°09′07″E
- Country: France
- Region: Hauts-de-France
- Department: Aisne
- Arrondissement: Laon
- Canton: Chauny
- Intercommunality: CA Chauny Tergnier La Fère

Government
  - Mayor (2026–32): Jean-Marie Chombart
- Area^{1}: 3.81 km^{2} (1.47 sq mi)
- Elevation: 100 m (330 ft)
- Highest elevation: 158 m (518 ft)
- Lowest elevation: 64 m (210 ft)
- Population (2023): 197
  - Density: 51.7/km^{2} (134/sq mi)
- Time zone: UTC+01:00 (CET)
  - Summer (DST): UTC+02:00 (CEST)
- INSEE/Postal code: 02546 /02300
- ^{1} French Land Register data, which excludes lakes, ponds, glaciers > 1 km^{2} (0.386 sq mi or 247 acres) and river estuaries.

La Neuville-en-Beine (French pronunciation: [la nøvil ɑ̃ bɛn]) is a commune in the Aisne department in Hauts-de-France in northern France.

== Population ==
Historical population
Year	Pop.	±% p.a.
1968	116	—
1975	103	−1.68%
1982	123	+2.57%
1990	148	+2.34%
1999	152	+0.30%
2007	166	+1.11%
2012	192	+2.95%
2017	197	+0.52%
2023	197	+0.00%
Source: INSEE

== See also ==
- Communes of the Aisne department
