= Frières-Faillouël =

- Commune
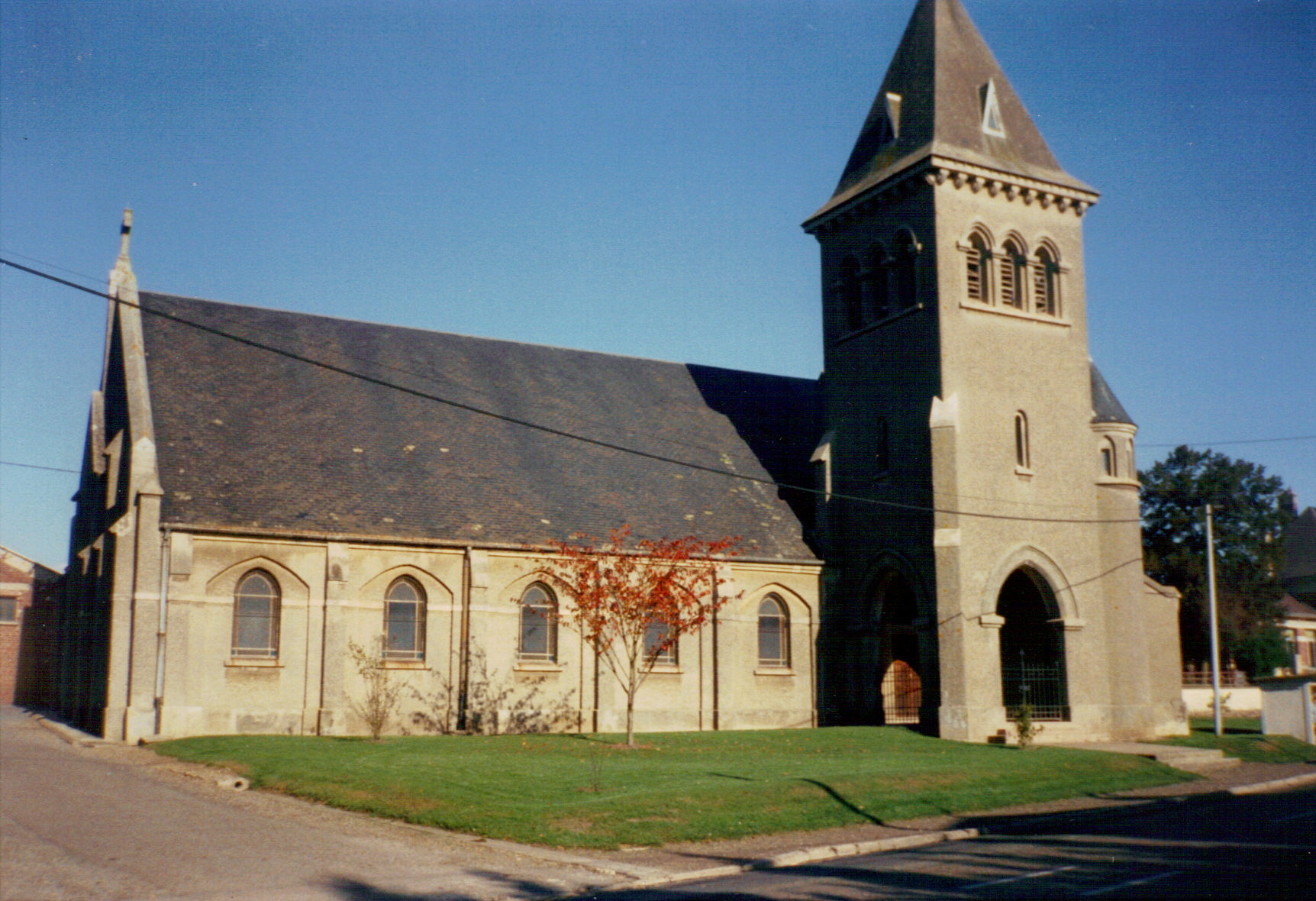
- The church of Frières-Faillouël
- Location of Frières-Faillouël
- Location within France Location within Hauts-de-France
- Coordinates: 49°41′18″N 3°14′34″E
- Country: France
- Region: Hauts-de-France
- Department: Aisne
- Arrondissement: Laon
- Canton: Chauny
- Intercommunality: CA Chauny Tergnier La Fère

Government
  - Mayor (2026–32): Laurent Czernich
- Area^{1}: 15.26 km^{2} (5.89 sq mi)
- Elevation: 70 m (230 ft)
- Highest elevation: 108 m (354 ft)
- Lowest elevation: 57 m (187 ft)
- Population (2023): 971
  - Density: 63.6/km^{2} (165/sq mi)
- Time zone: UTC+01:00 (CET)
  - Summer (DST): UTC+02:00 (CEST)
- INSEE/Postal code: 02336 /02700
- ^{1} French Land Register data, which excludes lakes, ponds, glaciers > 1 km^{2} (0.386 sq mi or 247 acres) and river estuaries.

Frières-Faillouël (French pronunciation: [fʁijɛʁ fajwɛl]) is a commune in the Aisne department in Hauts-de-France in northern France.

== Population ==
Historical population
Year	Pop.	±% p.a.
1968	660	—
1975	574	−1.97%
1982	635	+1.45%
1990	775	+2.52%
1999	774	−0.01%
2007	888	+1.73%
2012	1,003	+2.47%
2017	998	−0.10%
2023	971	−0.46%
Source: INSEE

== See also ==
- Communes of the Aisne department
