= Chevrières, Oise =

Chevrières
- Commune
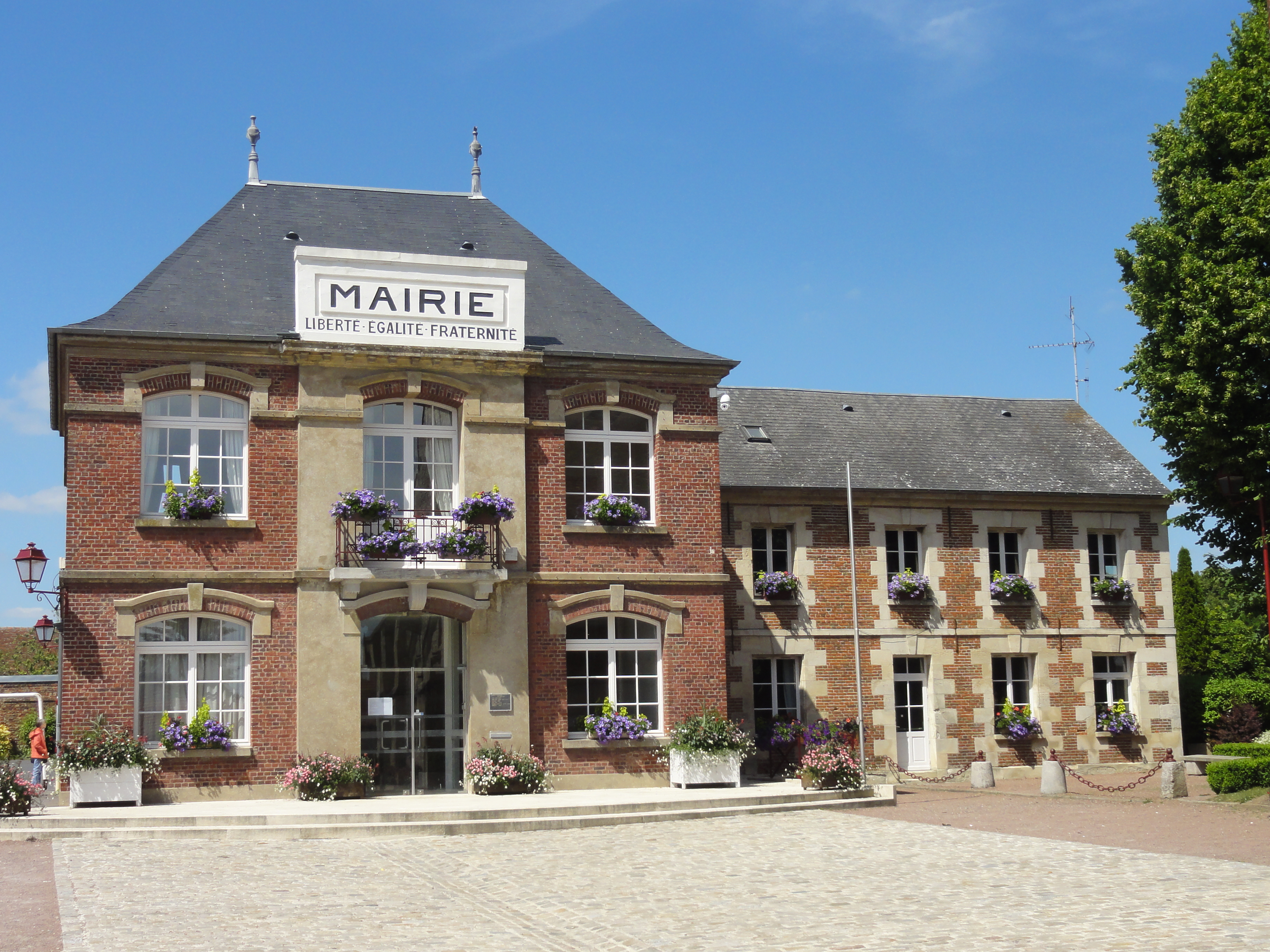
- The town hall in Chevrières

- Coat of arms
- Location of Chevrières
- Location within France Location within Hauts-de-France
- Coordinates: 49°20′44″N 2°41′00″E
- Country: France
- Region: Hauts-de-France
- Department: Oise
- Arrondissement: Compiègne
- Canton: Estrées-Saint-Denis
- Intercommunality: Plaine d'Estrées

Government
  - Mayor (2024–2026): Christelle Bensman
- Area^{1}: 12.4 km^{2} (4.8 sq mi)
- Highest elevation: 82 m (269 ft)
- Lowest elevation: 29 m (95 ft)
- Population (2023): 2,036
  - Density: 164/km^{2} (425/sq mi)
- Time zone: UTC+01:00 (CET)
  - Summer (DST): UTC+02:00 (CEST)
- INSEE/Postal code: 60149 /60710
- ^{1} French Land Register data, which excludes lakes, ponds, glaciers > 1 km^{2} (0.386 sq mi or 247 acres) and river estuaries.

Chevrières is a commune in the Oise department in northern France.

== Population ==
Historical population
Year	Pop.	±% p.a.
1968	1,264	—
1975	1,535	+2.81%
1982	1,605	+0.64%
1990	1,575	−0.24%
1999	1,632	+0.40%
2007	1,719	+0.65%
2012	1,839	+1.36%
2017	1,993	+1.62%
2023	2,036	+0.36%
Source: INSEE

== See also ==
- Communes of the Oise department
