= Beaumont-en-Beine =

- Commune
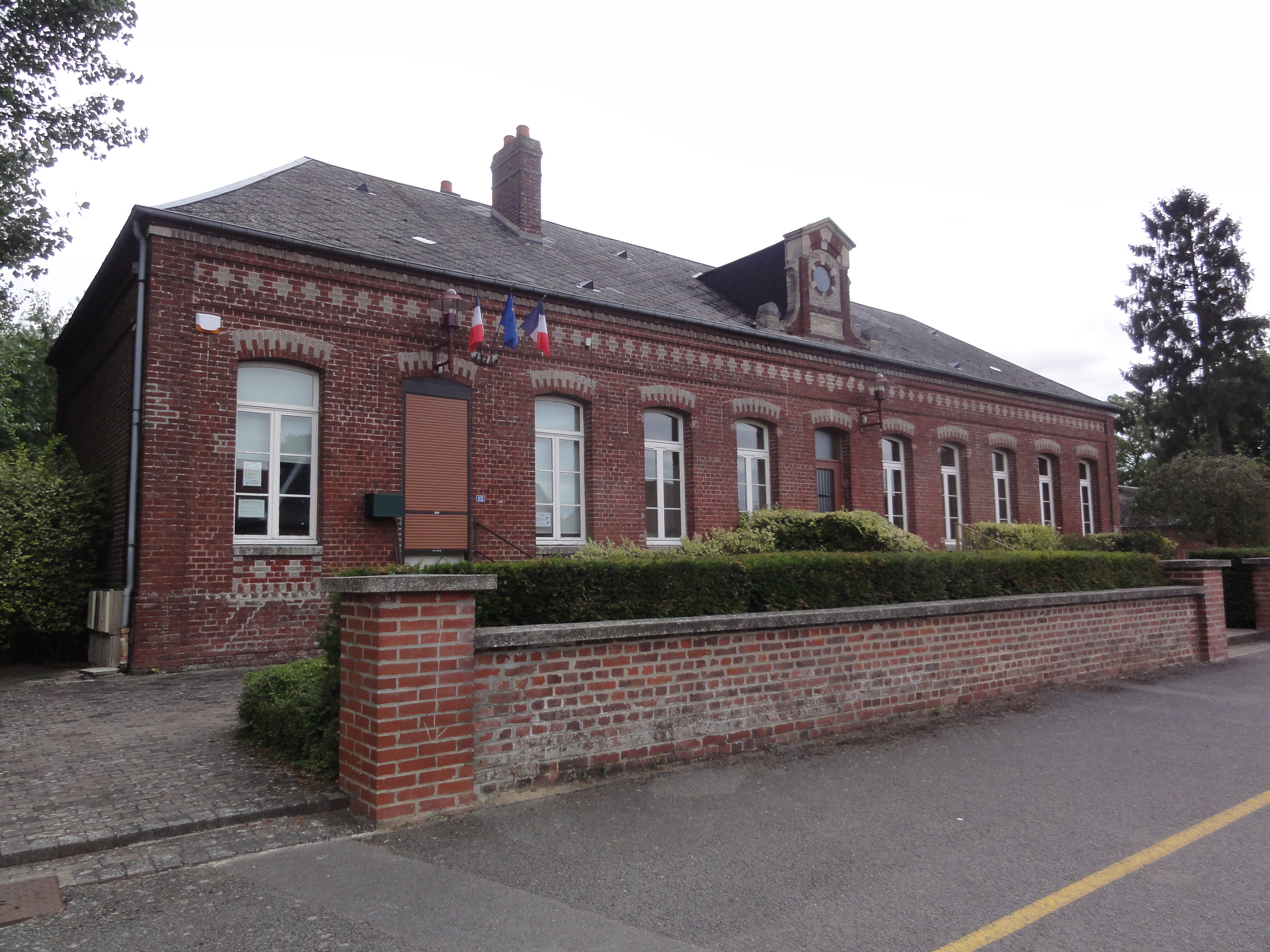
- Town hall and schools

- Coat of arms
- Location of Beaumont-en-Beine
- Location within France Location within Hauts-de-France
- Coordinates: 49°41′18″N 3°08′00″E
- Country: France
- Region: Hauts-de-France
- Department: Aisne
- Arrondissement: Laon
- Canton: Chauny
- Intercommunality: CA Chauny Tergnier La Fère

Government
  - Mayor (2026–32): Ludovic Thomas
- Area^{1}: 5.41 km^{2} (2.09 sq mi)
- Elevation: 100 m (330 ft)
- Highest elevation: 147 m (482 ft)
- Lowest elevation: 72 m (236 ft)
- Population (2023): 168
  - Density: 31.1/km^{2} (80.4/sq mi)
- Time zone: UTC+01:00 (CET)
  - Summer (DST): UTC+02:00 (CEST)
- INSEE/Postal code: 02056 /02300
- ^{1} French Land Register data, which excludes lakes, ponds, glaciers > 1 km^{2} (0.386 sq mi or 247 acres) and river estuaries.

Beaumont-en-Beine (French pronunciation: [bomɔ̃ ɑ̃ bɛn]) is a commune in the department of Aisne in Hauts-de-France in northern France.

== Population ==
Historical population
Year	Pop.	±% p.a.
1968	127	—
1975	128	+0.11%
1982	157	+2.96%
1990	138	−1.60%
1999	137	−0.08%
2007	150	+1.14%
2012	170	+2.53%
2017	177	+0.81%
2023	168	−0.87%
Source: INSEE

== See also ==
- Communes of the Aisne department
