= Ognes, Aisne =

Ognes
- Commune
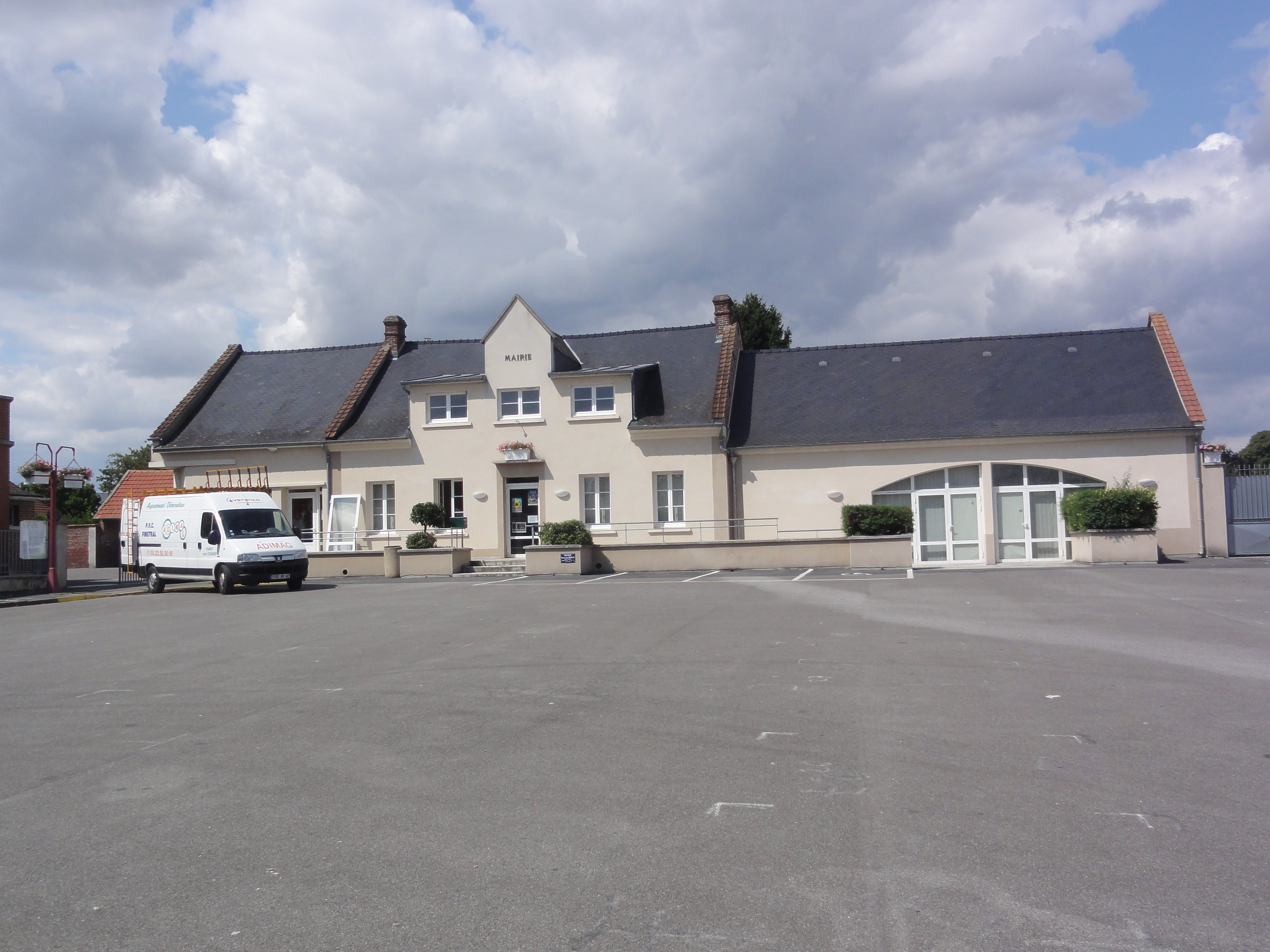
- The town hall of Ognes
- Location of Ognes
- Location within France Location within Hauts-de-France
- Coordinates: 49°36′41″N 3°11′42″E
- Country: France
- Region: Hauts-de-France
- Department: Aisne
- Arrondissement: Laon
- Canton: Chauny
- Intercommunality: CA Chauny Tergnier La Fère

Government
  - Mayor (2026–32): Patricia Goëtz
- Area^{1}: 6.14 km^{2} (2.37 sq mi)
- Elevation: 54 m (177 ft)
- Highest elevation: 95 m (312 ft)
- Lowest elevation: 41 m (135 ft)
- Population (2023): 1,109
  - Density: 181/km^{2} (468/sq mi)
- Time zone: UTC+01:00 (CET)
  - Summer (DST): UTC+02:00 (CEST)
- INSEE/Postal code: 02566 /02300
- ^{1} French Land Register data, which excludes lakes, ponds, glaciers > 1 km^{2} (0.386 sq mi or 247 acres) and river estuaries.

Ognes (French pronunciation: [ɔɲ]) is a commune in the Aisne department in Hauts-de-France in northern France.

== Population ==
Historical population
Year	Pop.	±% p.a.
1968	932	—
1975	1,050	+1.72%
1982	1,245	+2.46%
1990	1,169	−0.78%
1999	1,120	−0.47%
2007	1,126	+0.07%
2012	1,188	+1.08%
2017	1,113	−1.30%
2023	1,109	−0.06%
Source: INSEE

== See also ==
- Communes of the Aisne department
