= Mounted Memorial, Canberra =

Coordinates: 35°17′14.67″S 149°08′31.83″E

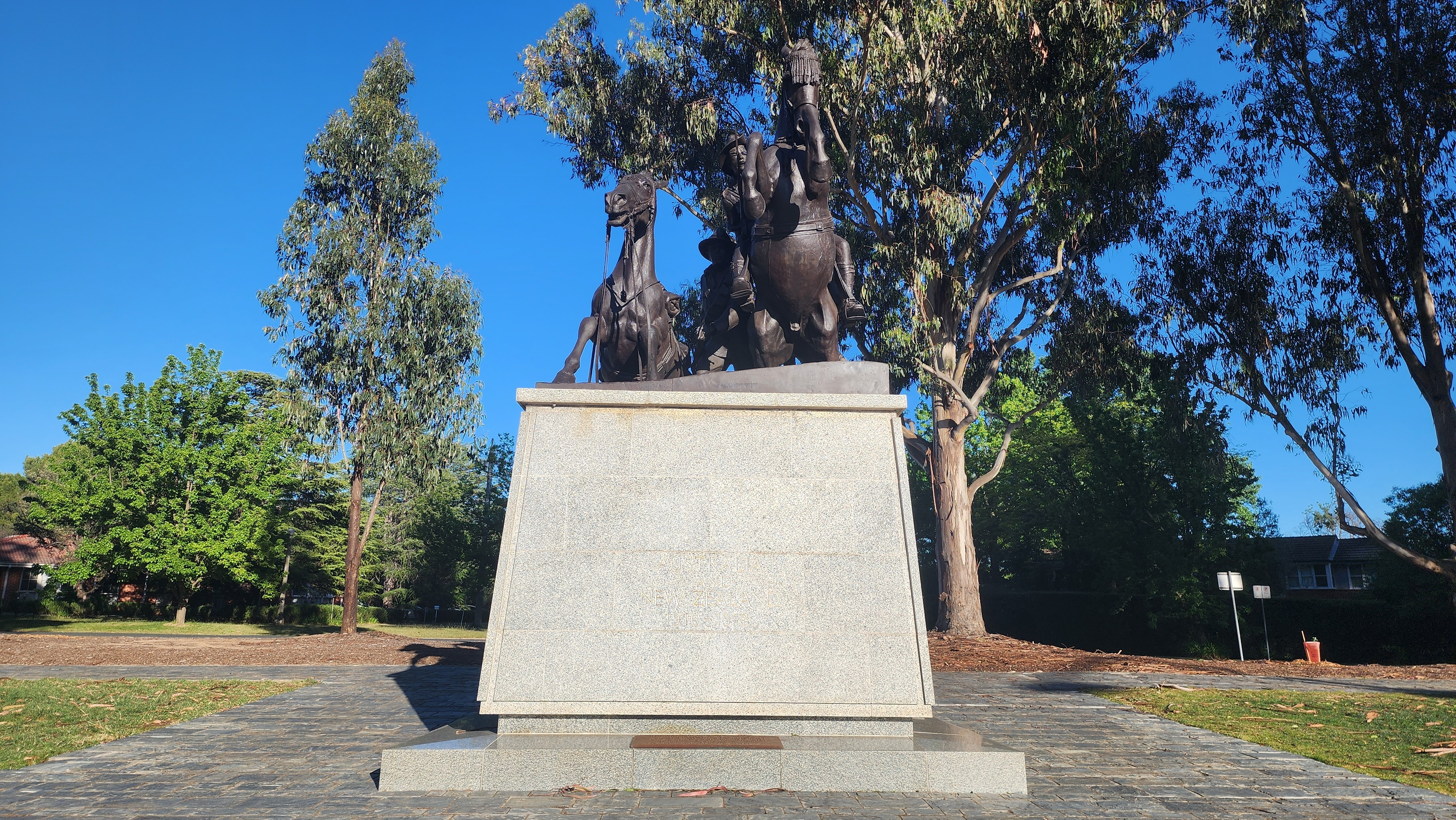

The Mounted Memorial, Canberra is on Anzac Parade, the principal ceremonial and memorial avenue in Canberra, the national capital city of Australia. It is a copy of a memorial that was originally constructed in Port Said in 1932 but removed in 1956; a second copy was erected at Mount Clarence, Western Australia. The memorial was sculpted by Melbourne born sculptor, Sir Edgar Bertram Mackennal (1863-1918) - it was his last piece before his death.

== Design ==
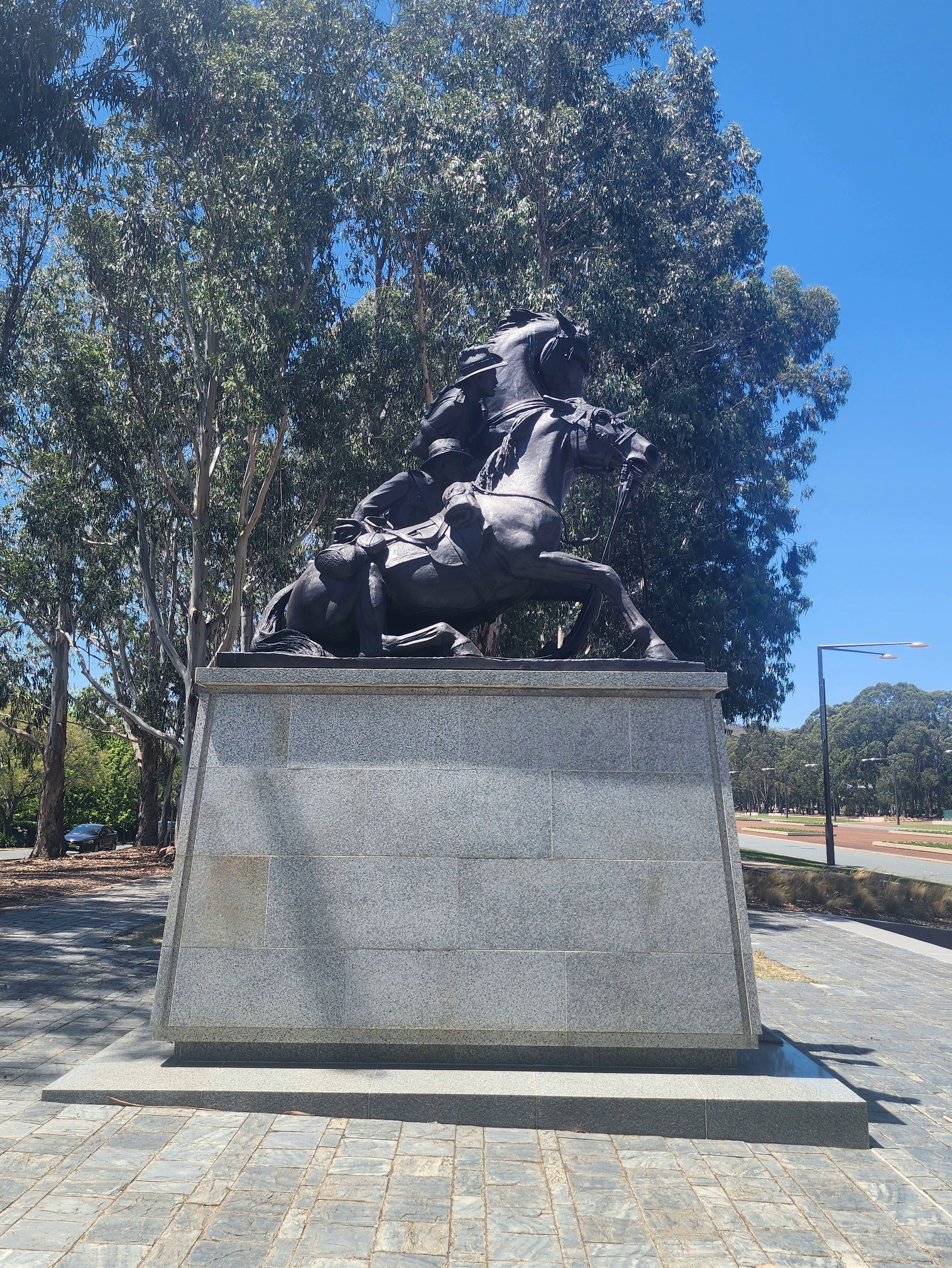
Side view

The memorial shows Australian Army and New Zealand Army horse riders in action. They are wearing the typical uniform of World War I including the slouch hat and the "lemon squeezer" campaign hat that are iconic of the 'Diggers' of Australia and New Zealand respectively.

The horse of the New Zealander on the right has been injured or shot, and the rider is falling to the ground; the rider on the left is supporting his mate.

== Plaques and History ==
A plaque at the front of the memorial records as follows:

This statue is a copy of one originally forming part
of a memorial which was erected at Port Said and
unveiled on 23 November 1932 by the Rt. Hon. William Morris Hughes, K.C. MP.

The original memorial bore the inscription
"Erected by their comrades and the governments
of Australia and New Zealand in memory of the
members of the Australian Light Horse, the New
Zealand Mounted Rifles, The Imperial Camel Corps
and the Australian Flying Corps who lost their lives
in Egypt, Palestine and Syria 1916 - 1919"

The statue itself was irreparably damaged during
the Suez Crisis in 1956. The remnants were brought
to Australia and a replica was constructed.
Two castings in bronze were made, the first of which
was erected on the original masonry base at Albany
Western Australia in 1964.

Unveiled by the Rt. Hon. J.G. Gorton MP
Prime Minister of Australia on 19 April 1968

A second plaque nearby records:

This plaque records the service in the
Australian Imperial Force
of
General Sir Henry ("Harry") George Chauvel
G.C.M.G., K.C.B.
1865 - 1945

Australian cavalry leader of 1914-1918 who commanded
the 1st Light Horse Brigade and the 1st Australian
Division on Gallipoli in 1915, then successively
commanded the ANZAC Mounted Division, the Desert
Column and the Desert Mounted Corps in operations
in Egypt, Palestine and Syria 1916-1918

On Anzac Day 2005, as on previous similar commemorations, mounted members of the Australian Army or commemoration teams were at the memorial, as was obvious from copious amounts of horse droppings around the memorial; some can be seen in the photograph.

== Commemorations of the Battle of Beersheba ==
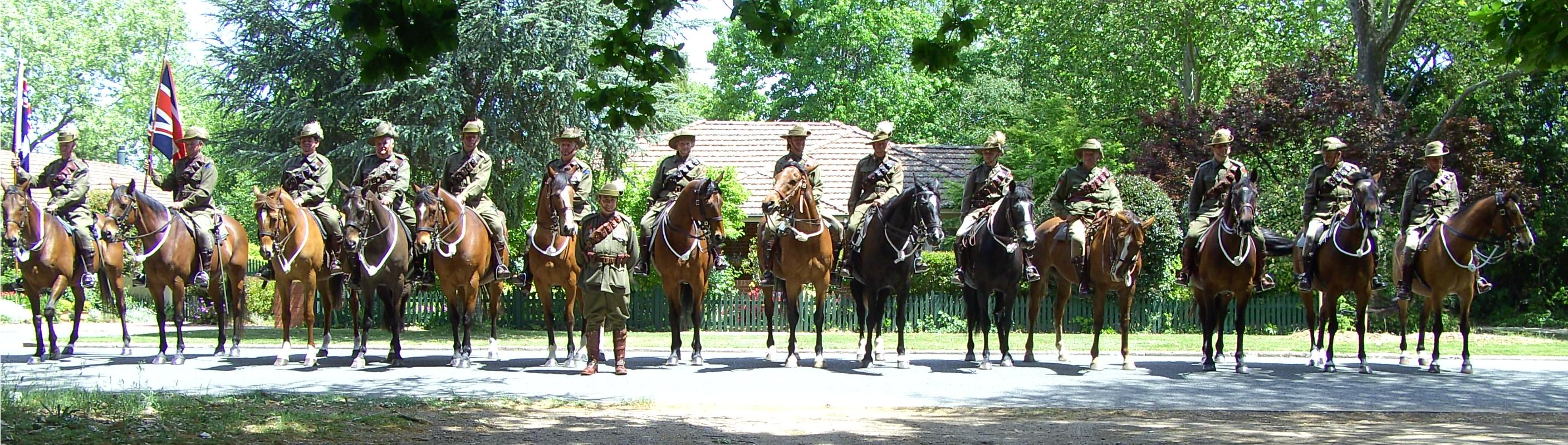
2012 - 95th anniversary

Commemorations for the Battle of Beersheba typically occur at the memorial in Canberra every year on 31 October, with bigger gatherings on the 5-year dates.
