= List of canals in France =

This is a list of the navigable canals and rivers in France. For reference purposes, all waterways, whether navigable or not, are listed. Many navigations were abandoned between 1925 and 1955, with some in later years.

== Sources ==
An important source of up-to-date information on French waterways is Inland Waterways of France, by David Edwards-May (published by Imray Ltd in 2010), and its online version, The Waterways of France by Region. Other sources using the same public information are the publishing house Berger-Levrault, Hugh McKnight, David Jefferson, Editions de l'Ecluse (Fluvial magazine) and the series of waterway guides published by Les Editions du Breil, all listed below the table. A comprehensive historic list with 513 entries for French canals is published online by Charles Berg.

== List ==
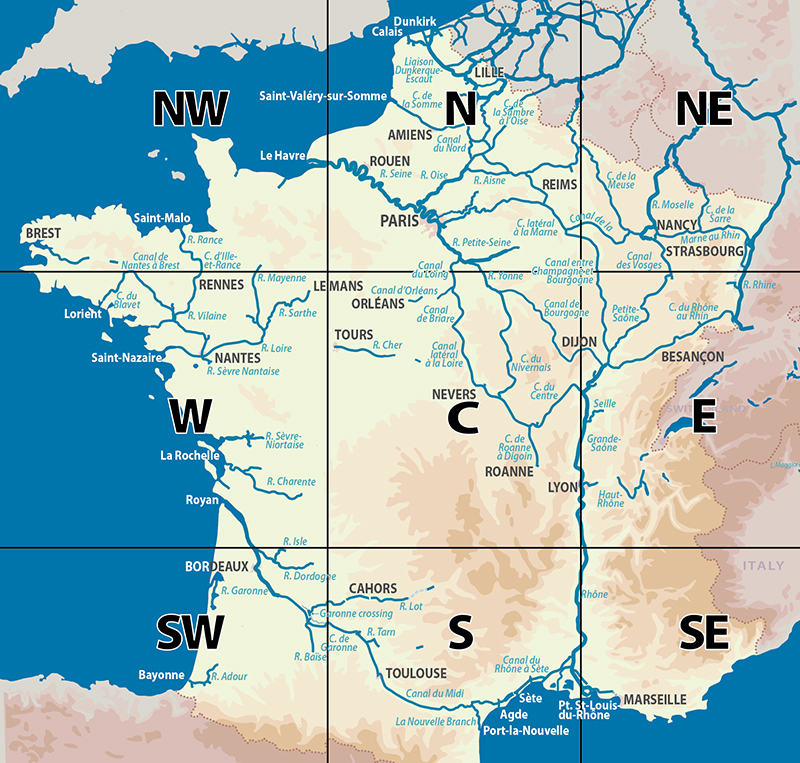
Map of canals in France (see Map column in table).

The list includes two major rivers, the Rhine and the Rhône, that have their source in Switzerland, while others flow out of France into Germany, Luxemburg and Belgium (the Sarre, Moselle, Sambre, Escaut and Lys). Cross-border canals change their name at the border. The canals are listed in order of the Sort name column. Locations given in red are temporary limits of navigation, where continued restoration works are under way or planned.

The Map column should be used in conjunction with the map to the right which may be enlarged, to see the location of the waterway in relation to the overall network.

Below the table are References, grouped together to avoid fastidious repetition, while notes on status, navigability or connections are added under the third column heading 'Navigability'.

Sort name^{[A]}	Waterway (canal or river) Ref.	Navigability, and alternative (French) name	From (waterway)	At (locality)	To (waterway or sea)	At (locality)	Length (km)	Number of locks	Map
Aa	Aa	Upstream 2 km and 1 lock disused		Saint-Omer	North Sea	Gravelines	28.8	2	N
Adour	Adour			Dax		Anglet	66		SW
Aff	Aff			Glénac		La Gacilly	7		W
Aire	Canal d'Aire		Canal de la Deûle	Bauvin	Canal de Neuffossé	Aire-sur-la-Lys			N
Aisne	Aisne			Compiègne		Vailly-sur-Aisne	57.1	7	N
Aisne lat	Canal latéral à l'Aisne		Aisne	Celles-sur-Aisne	Canal des Ardennes	Vieux-lès-Asfeld	51.3	8	N
Aisne-Marne	Canal de l'Aisne à la Marne		Canal latéral à l'Aisne	Berry-au-Bac	Canal latéral à la Marne	Condé-sur-Marne	58.1	24	N
Alsace	Grand Canal d'Alsace	Lateral canal included for reference, part of river Rhine	Rhine	Huningue	Rhine	Neuf-Brisach	53	4	E
Ardennes	Canal des Ardennes		Canal latéral à l'Aisne	Vieux-lès-Asfeld	Canal de la Meuse	Pont-à-Bar	88	43	N
Arles	Canal d'Arles à Fos		Rhône	Arles		Fos-sur-Mer	31	1	SE
Aulne	Aulne	Part of Canal de Nantes à Brest, includes 18 km of canal		Landévennec		Goariva	110	46	W
Autize J	Canal de la Jeune-Autise			Souil 46.40425°N 0.76458°W	Sèvre Niortaise	Maillé	8.5	1	W
Autize V	Canal de la Vieille-Autise			Bouillé-Courdault	Sèvre Niortaise		10	1	W
Baise	Baïse			Saint-Léger		Valence-sur-Baïse	63	21	SW
Beaucaire	Canal de Beaucaire	Part of Canal du Rhône à Sète, no connection at Beaucaire	Rhône	Beaucaire		Aigues-Mortes	51		S
Bergues	Canal de Bergues	No connection at Bergues, Canal de la Colme disused	Canal de la Colme	Bergues	North Sea	Dunkerque	8.1	0	N
Berry	Canal de Berry	Restored section accessible from river Cher		Selles-sur-Cher	Cher	Noyers-sur-Cher	12	6	C
Beuvry	Canal de Beuvry		Canal Dunkerque-Escaut			Beuvry	0.6		N
Bidouze	Bidouze			Bec-des-Gaves		Bidache	17.8		SW
Blavet	Canal du Blavet		Canal de Nantes à Brest	Pontivy	Atlantic Ocean	Lorient	70	28	W
Bourbourg	Canal de Bourbourg		Canal de Furnes and Port of Dunkerque	Dunkerque	Aa	Le Guindal nr. Bourbourg	21	3	N
Bourgogne	Canal de Bourgogne		Yonne	Migennes	Saône	Saint-Jean-de-Losne	242.1	189	C
Boutonne	Boutonne	No connection with Charente, gated sluice structure with no lock		Saint-Jean-d'Angély	Charente	Tonnay-Charente	30 Atlantic Ocean	4	W
Briare	Canal de Briare		Canal du Loing and Canal d'Orléans	Montargis	Loire and Canal latéral à la Loire	Briare	54.2	32	C
Brienne	Canal de Brienne	Canal de Saint-Pierre	Garonne	Toulouse	Port de l'Embouchure	Toulouse	1.56	2	S
Brouage	Canal de Brouage		Canal de la Charente à la Seudre			Hiers-Brouage	2	1	W
Bruche	Canal de la Bruche	Disused, cycle path on former towpath	Bruche	Soultz-les-Bains	Ill	Strasbourg	20	11	E
Caen	Canal de Caen à la Mer	Canal Maritime de Caen	Port of Caen	Caen	English Channel	Ouistreham	14	1	NW
Calais	Canal de Calais		Aa	Ruminghem	Strait of Dover	Calais	30	3	N
Centre	Canal du Centre	Canal du Charollais	Canal latéral à la Loire and Canal de Roanne à Digoin	Digoin	Saône	Chalon-sur-Saône	112.1	61	C
Charente	Charente			Angoulême		Fouras	167	21	W
Charente-S	Canal de la Charente à la Seudre	Canal Bridoire	Charente	Rochefort	Seudre	Marennes	39	5	W
Chatillon	Embranchement de Châtillon		Loire	Châtillon-sur-Loire	Canal latéral à la Loire	L'Etang	4	3	C
Chelles	Canal de Chelles	Lateral canal, part of river Marne	Marne	Neuilly-sur-Marne	Marne	Vaires-sur-Marne	8.5		N
Cher	Cher			Noyers-sur-Cher		Larcay	54.2	14	C
Clignon	Canal du Clignon		Canal de l'Ourcq	Neufchelles		Montigny-l'Allier	1.2	0	N
Colmar	Embranchement de Colmar	Canal de Colmar		Colmar	Rhin	Neuf-Brisach	22.6	3	E
Colme	Canal de la Haute Colme	Disused, drainage only	Aa	Watten	Canal de Bergues	Bergues			N
Colme	Canal de la Basse Colme	Disused, drainage only	Aa	Bergues		Hondschoote			N
Deule	Canal de la Deûle		Canal d'Aire (Liaison Dunkerque-Escaut)	Bauvin	Lys	Deûlémont	35.8	3	N
Dordogne	Dordogne			Saint-Pierre-d'Eyraud		Castillon-la-Bataille	118		SW
Doubs	Doubs	See also Canal du Rhône au Rhin		Verdun-sur-le-Doubs		Pontoux	5.5		E
Durance	Canal de Craponne	No. Sixteenth century irrigation	Durance	La Roque-d'Anthéron	Mediterranean Rhône	Etang de Berre Arles	circa 50km		S
Dunkerque-E	Canal Dunkerque-Escaut	Liaison Dunkerque-Escaut	North Sea	Dunkerque	Escaut	Bouchain	189	14	N
Erdre	Erdre			Nort-sur-Erdre		Nantes	27.7	1	W
Escaut	Canal de l'Escaut		Canal de Saint-Quentin	Cambrai	Haut-Escaut (Belgium)	Mortagne-du-Nord	58.7	11	N
Etangs	Canal des Étangs	Original name of canal now incorporated in Canal du Rhône à Sète		Sète		Aigues-Mortes	49		S
Faux-Remparts	Canal des Faux-Remparts	River arm reserved for passenger boats	Ill	Strasbourg	Ill	Strasbourg	2	1	NE
Furnes	Canal de Furnes	Canal Nieuport-Dunkerque (name in Flanders)		Dunkerque		Furnes	13.3	1	N
Garonne	Garonne		Gironde	Bec d'Ambès	Canal lateral a la Garonne	Castets-en-Dorthe	79.4		SW
Garonne	Canal de Garonne	Historic name Canal latéral à la Garonne	Garonne	Castets-en-Dorthe	Canal du Midi and Canal de Brienne	Toulouse	193.6	53	SW
Gironde	Gironde		Garonne	Bec d'Ambès	Atlantic Ocean	Le Verdon-sur-Mer	70.5		W
Givors	Givors canal	Long abandoned and mostly infilled	Rhône		Loire		56	99	E
Henri	Canal Henri IV	Historic name, branch of Canal de Briare	Loire	Briare	Canal de Briare	Briare		3	C
Herault	Hérault			Bessan	Mediterranean	le Grau d'Agde	12	1	S
Huningue	Canal de Huningue		Rhine	Huningue		Niffer			E
Ill	Ill			Ostwald		Strasbourg	9.9	1	NE
Ille	Canal d'Ille-et-Rance		Rance estuary	Dinan	Vilaine	Rennes	84.8	47	NW
Isle	Isle			Laubardemont	Dordogne	Libourne	31.1		SW
Jonction	Canal du Jonction	Part of the La Nouvelle branch of the Canal du Midi	Canal de la Robine	Moussoulens	Canal du Midi	Port de la Robine	5	7	S
Kembs	Kembs-Niffer Branch Canal		Grand Canal d'Alsace	Kembs	Canal du Rhône au Rhin		13	0	E
Lalinde	Canal de Lalinde	Disused since early 1960s, partially restored	Dordogne	Tuilières	Dordogne	Mauzac	15	9	SW
Landes	Canal des Landes		Étang de Biscarrosse		Bassin d'Arcachon		15		SW
Lens	Canal de Lens			Lens	Canal de la Deûle	Oignies	8		N
Lez	Lez			Lattes		Palavas-les-Flots	5	1	S
Loing	Canal du Loing		Seine	Saint-Mammès	Canal de Briare and Canal d'Orléans	Montargis	49.5	19	N
Loire M	Loire maritime			Nantes	Atlantic Ocean	Saint Nazaire	52.5		W
Loire	Loire		Maine	Bouchemaine		Nantes	84.9	0	W
Loire lat	Canal latéral à la Loire		Loire and Canal de Briare	Briare	Canal du Centre and Canal de Roanne à Digoin	Digoin	196.1	37	C
Lorraines	Lorraines Branch	Disused, no navigation	Canal latéral à la Loire		Allier		3	0	C
Lot aval	Lot aval	Navigation interrupted at Fumel dam, project pending	Garonne	Nicole		Albas	120	19	S
Lot central	Lot central			Luzech		Larnagol	74	17	S
Lot amont	Lot amont			La Roque-Bouillac		Flagnac	12	3	S
Lys	Lys	Leie (Flanders)		Aire-sur-la-Lys		Halluin	66.5	8	NE
Maine P	Petite Maine		Sèvre Nantaise			Château-Thébaud	6		W
Maine	Maine		Mayenne	Angers	Loire	Bouchemaine	11	1	W
Manche	Canal de Vire-et-Taute	Navigation interrupted at dam, project pending	Vire	Saint-Fromond	English Channel	Carentan	12		NW
Marans LR	Canal de Marans à la Rochelle		Sèvre Niortaise	Marans	Atlantic Ocean	La Rochelle			W
Marans M	Canal maritime de Marans à la mer		Sèvre Niortaise	Marans	Sèvre Niortaise	Charron			W
Marne lat	Canal latéral à la Marne		Marne	Epernay	Canal de la Marne au Rhin	Vitry-le-Francois	66.7	15	NE
Marne	Marne		Haute-Seine	Charenton-le-Pont	Canal latéral à la Marne	Dizy	183.4	18	N
Marne-R	Canal de la Marne au Rhin		Canal de la Marne à la Saône and Canal latéral à la Marne	Vitry-le-François	Rhine	Strasbourg	313	154	NE
Champagne	Canal entre Champagne et Bourgogne	Historic name Canal de la Marne à la Saône	Canal latéral à la Marne	Vitry-le-François	Saône	Heuilley-sur-Saône	224.2	114	E
Marseille	Canal de Marseille au Rhône	Historic name, no navigation through Rove tunnel	Rhône	Arles	Mediterranean Sea	Marseille			SE
Mayenne	Mayenne		Maine	Angers		Mayenne	122.5	45	W
Meaux	Canal de Meaux à Chalifert	Canal de Chalifert	Marne	Meaux	Marne	Chalifert	12	3	N
Meuse	Canal de la Meuse	Canal de l'Est North Branch		Givet		Troussey	272.4	59	NE
Midi	Canal du Midi	Canal des Deux Mers	Port de l'Embouchure	Toulouse	Etang de Thau	Sète	240.2	64	S
Mignon	Canal du Mignon		Sèvre Niortaise	La Grève-sur-Mignon		Mauzé-sur-le-Mignon	11	2	W
Montech	Canal de Montech	Montauban Branch	Canal de Garonne	Montech	Tarn	Montauban	10.9	9	S
Morin	Canal du Grand Morin		Grand Morin		Canal de Meaux à Chalifert		12	0	N
Moselle	Canal des mines de fer de la Moselle	CAMIFEMO, now incorporated in high-capacity Moselle navigation	Moselle	Metz	Moselle	Thionville	30	4	NE
Moselle	Moselle			Apach		Neuves-Maisons	152	15	NE
Nancy	Embranchement de Nancy		Canal de la Marne au Rhin	Laneuveville	Canal des Vosges	Richardmesnil	10.2	18	E
Nantes	Canal de Nantes à Brest		Loire and Sevre Nantaise	Nantes	Canal du Blavet	Pontivy	184	104	W
Neufosse	Canal de Neuffossé	Mostly incorporated in Liaison Dunkerque-Escaut	Aa	Arques	Canal d'Aire	Aire-sur-la-Lys			N
Nieppe	Canal de la Nieppe	Abandoned	Lys	Thiennes	Lys	Merville	23	4	N
Nivernais	Canal du Nivernais		Loire	Decize	Yonne	Auxerre	174.1	110	C
Nord	Canal du Nord		Canal de la Sensée	Arleux	Canal latéral à l'Oise	Noyon	95.1	19	N
Nouvelle	Embranchement de La Nouvelle		Canal du Midi	Port de la Robine	Mediterranean	Port-la-Nouvelle	36	13	S
Oise A	Canal de l'Oise à l'Aisne		Canal latéral à l'Oise	Abbécourt	Canal latéral à l'Aisne	Bourg-et-Comin	47.8	13	N
Oise lat	Canal latéral à l'Oise			Janville	Canal de Saint-Quentin and Canal de l'Oise à l'Aisne	Chauny	33.9	4	N
Oise	Oise			Conflans-Sainte-Honorine		Janville	104.4	7	N
Orleans	Canal d'Orléans		Loire	Orléans	Canal du Loing and Canal de Briare	Montargis	15	2	C
Oudon	Oudon			Segré		Le Lion-d'Angers	18	3	W
Ourcq	Canal de l'Ourcq		Canal Saint-Martin and Canal de Saint-Denis	Paris		Port-aux-Perches	108.1	10	N
Pommeroeul	Canal de Pommerœul à Condé		Escaut	Condé-sur-l'Escaut	Canal Nimy-Blaton-Péronnes (Belgium)	Pommerœul	6	2	N
Pont	Canal de Pont-de-Vaux		Saône	Fleurville		Pont-de-Vaux	3.5	1	E
Rance	Rance Maritime			Saint Malo		Dinan	22.6	2	NW
Rhône	Canal du Rhône au Rhin (North Branch)			Strasbourg	Rhin	Rhinau	36	13	NE
Rhône	Canal du Rhône au Rhin	Historically named 'South Branch'	Saône	Saint-Symphorien-sur-Saône	Rhine (Grand Canal d'Alsace)	Niffer	237.2	112	NE
Rhône	Haut Rhône			Anglefort		Lyon	140	1	E
Rhône	Rhône			Lyon		Port-Saint-Louis-du-Rhône	310	13	SE
Rhône	Canal du Rhône à Sète	Rhône-Sète Canal	Rhône	Beaucaire	Etang de Thau		71	1	S
Rhône	Petit Rhône		Rhône	Fourques	Mediterranean Sea	Saintes-Maries-de-la-Mer	59		S
Roanne	Canal de Roanne à Digoin		Canal latéral à la Loire and Canal du Centre	Digoin		Roanne	55.6	10	C
Robine	Canal de la Robine	Part of La Nouvelle branch of Canal du Midi	Canal de Jonction	Moussoulens	Mediterranean Sea	Port-la-Nouvelle	31.6	6	S
Roubaix	Canal de Roubaix		Deûle	Marquette-lez-Lille	Canal de l'Espierres (Belgium)	Leers	20	12	N
Saint-D	Canal Saint-Denis		Ourcq Canal and Canal Saint-Martin	Paris	Seine	Saint-Denis	6.7	7	N
Saint-M	Canal Saint-Martin		Seine	Paris	Canal de l'Ourcq and Saint-Denis Canal	Paris	4.6	9	N
Saint-Q	Canal de Saint-Quentin		Canal latéral à l'Oise and Canal de l'Oise à l'Aisne	Chauny	Scheldt	Cambrai	92.6	35	N
Sambre	Sambre		Canal de la Sambre à l'Oise	Landrecies	Sambre (Belgium)	Jeumont	54.2	9	N
Sambre O	Canal de la Sambre à l'Oise	Currently not navigable pending restoration works	Canal de Saint-Quentin	La Fère	Sambre	Landrecies	67.2	38	N
Saone	Petite Saône		Canal des Vosges	Corre	Grande Saône	Saint-Symphorien-sur-Saône	158.7	19	E
Saone	Grande Saône		Petite Saône	Saint-Symphorien	Rhône	Lyon	213	5	E
Saone	Canal de la Haute-Saône	Canal de Montbéliard à la Haute-Saône		Botans	Canal du Rhône au Rhin		9.7	5	E
Sarre C	Canal de la Sarre	Historically Canal des Houillères de la Sarre	Canal de la Marne au Rhin	Gondrexange	Sarre canalisée	Sarreguemines	63.4	27	NE
Sarre R	Sarre canalisée		Canal de la Sarre	Sarreguemines	Saar (Germany)	Grosbliederstroff	12	2	NE
Sarthe	Sarthe			Angers		Le Mans	130.3	20	W
Savieres	Canal de Savières		Lac du Bourget		Haut-Rhône	Chanaz	4.2	1	N
Scarpe Inf	Scarpe inférieure			Douai		Mortagne-du-Nord	36.2	6	N
Scarpe Sup	Scarpe supérieure			Arras		Corbehem	23.1	9	N
Seille	Seille			La Truchère		Louhans	39	4	E
Seine NE	Seine–Nord Europe Canal	Canal Seine-Nord - PROJECTED 2024	Oise	Compiègne	Liaison Dunkerque-Escaut	Aubencheul-au-Bac	107	6	N
Seine M	Seine Maritime		English Channel	Le Havre		Rouen	105.7	0	NW
Seine H	Haute-Seine			Paris	Yonne	Montereau-Fault-Yonne	101	8	N
Seine B	Basse Seine		Haute-Seine	Paris	Seine Maritime	Rouen	242.4	6	N
Seine P	Petite Seine		Canal de la Haute-Seine	Marcilly-sur-Seine		Montereau-Fault-Yonne	67.6	11	N
Seine C	Canal de la Haute-Seine	Disused, restoration in progress		Marcilly-sur-Seine		Troyes	44	15	N
Sensee	Canal de la Sensée	Incorporated in Liaison Dunkerque-Escaut	Escaut	Hordain	Deûle	Douai	25		N
Seudre	Seudre			Saujon			18		W
Sevre Na	Sèvre Nantaise		Loire	Nantes		Monnières	21.5	1	W
Sevre Ni	Sèvre Niortaise			Niort	Atlantic Ocean	Charron	72	8	W
Somme	Canal de la Somme		English Channel	Saint-Valéry-sur-Somme	Canal de Saint-Quentin	Saint-Simon	156.5	25	N
Tancarville	Canal de Tancarville	Canal du Havre à Tancarville	English Channel	Le Havre	Seine	Tancarville	25	2	NW
Vilaine	Vilaine		Canal d'Ille-et-Rance	Rennes	Atlantic Ocean	Tréhiguier	137	13	W
Vosges	Canal des Vosges	Historically Canal de l'Est Southern Branch	Moselle	Neuves-Maisons	Petite-Saône	Corre	121.5	93	NE
Yonne	Yonne		Seine	Montereau-fault-Yonne	Canal du Nivernais	Auxerre	108	26	N

== See publications listing canals and waterways in France ==
- Edwards-May, David (2010). Inland Waterways of France. Imray Ltd. ISBN 978-1-846230-14-1
- Voies Navigables France Itinéraires Fluviaux. Editions De L'Ecluse. 2009. ISBN 978-2-916919-21-8.
- Jefferson, David (2009). Through the French Canals. Adlard Coles Nautical. p. 275. ISBN 978-1-4081-0381-4.
- McKnight, Hugh (2005). Cruising French Waterways, 4th Edition. Sheridan House. ISBN 9781574092103.
- Rolt, L. T. C. (1994). From Sea to Sea (2nd edition), Euromapping ISBN 9782910185-02-2.
- "La gestion du Canal de la Bruche" [The management of the Canal Bruche] (in French). Conseil Départemental du Bas-Rhin. Archived from the original on 16 September 2015. Retrieved 16 September 2015.
- Loire Nivernais Waterways Guide 02. Editions du Breil, Castelnaudary, France, ISBN 2-913120-00-8.
- Seine Waterways Guide 21. Editions du Breil, Castelnaudary, France, 2016. ISBN 2-913120-40-7.

== See also ==
- Rivers in France
- Canal de Craponne
- Bief de la Folie

== Notes ==
- Sort Name ^{A} The first key word of the title.
