= Vieille-Autise Canal =

Canal in western France

Canal de la Vieille-Autise
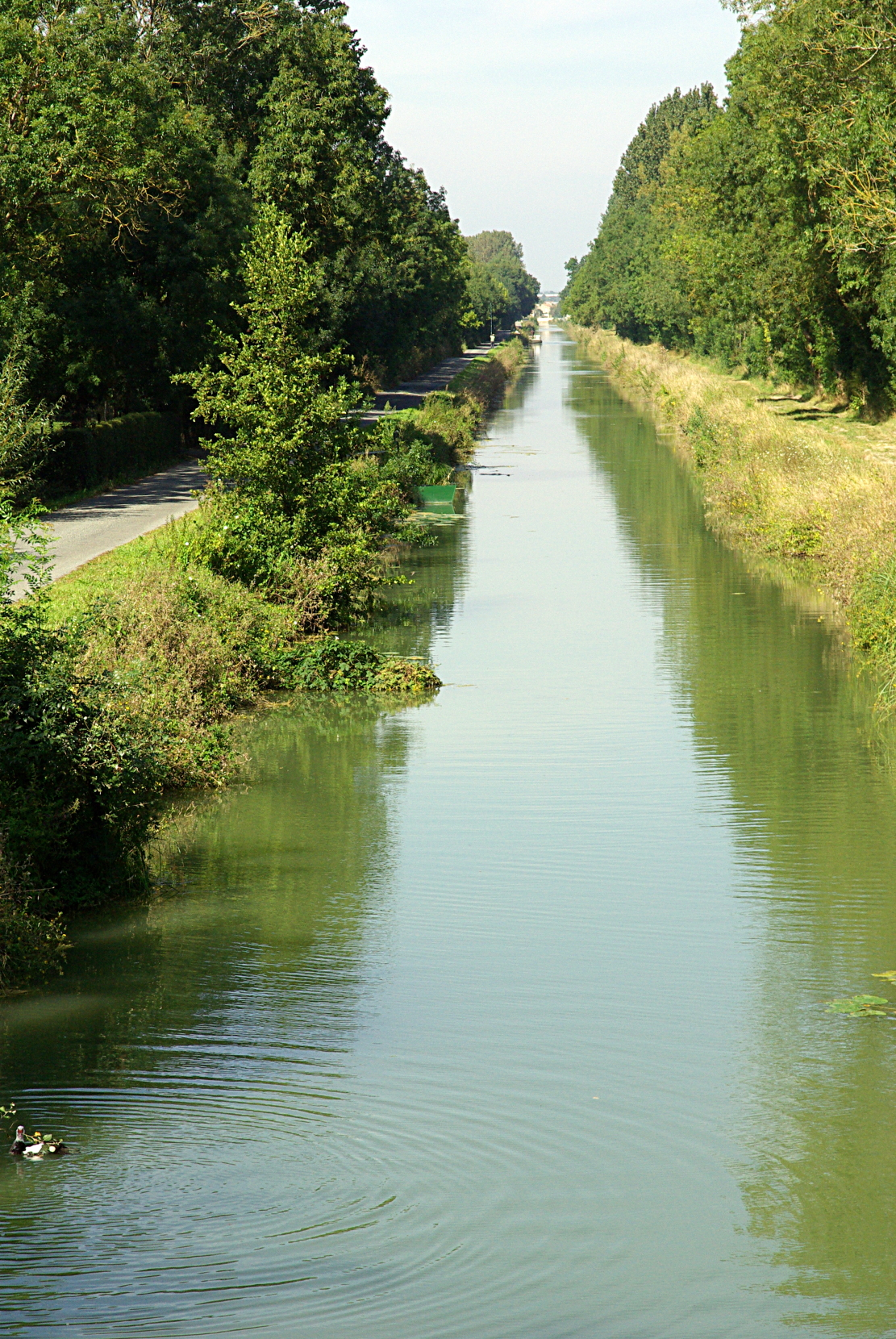
- The waterway called "Le canal de Courdault", in Saint-Sigismond, Vendée, France.

Specifications
- Length: 10 km (6.2 mi)
- Locks: 1

Geography
- Start point: Bouillé-Courdault
- End point: Sèvre Niortaise near Damvix
- Beginning coordinates: 46.37956°N 0.67334°W
- Ending coordinates: 46.32485°N 0.75999°W

The Canal de la Vieille-Autise (French pronunciation: [kanal də la vjɛj otiz], lit. 'Old Autise Canal') is a canal in western France connecting Courdault to the river Sèvre Niortaise near Damvix. It is 10 km long and has one lock.

== See also ==
- List of canals in France
