= Clignon Canal =

Canal in northern France

Canal du Clignon
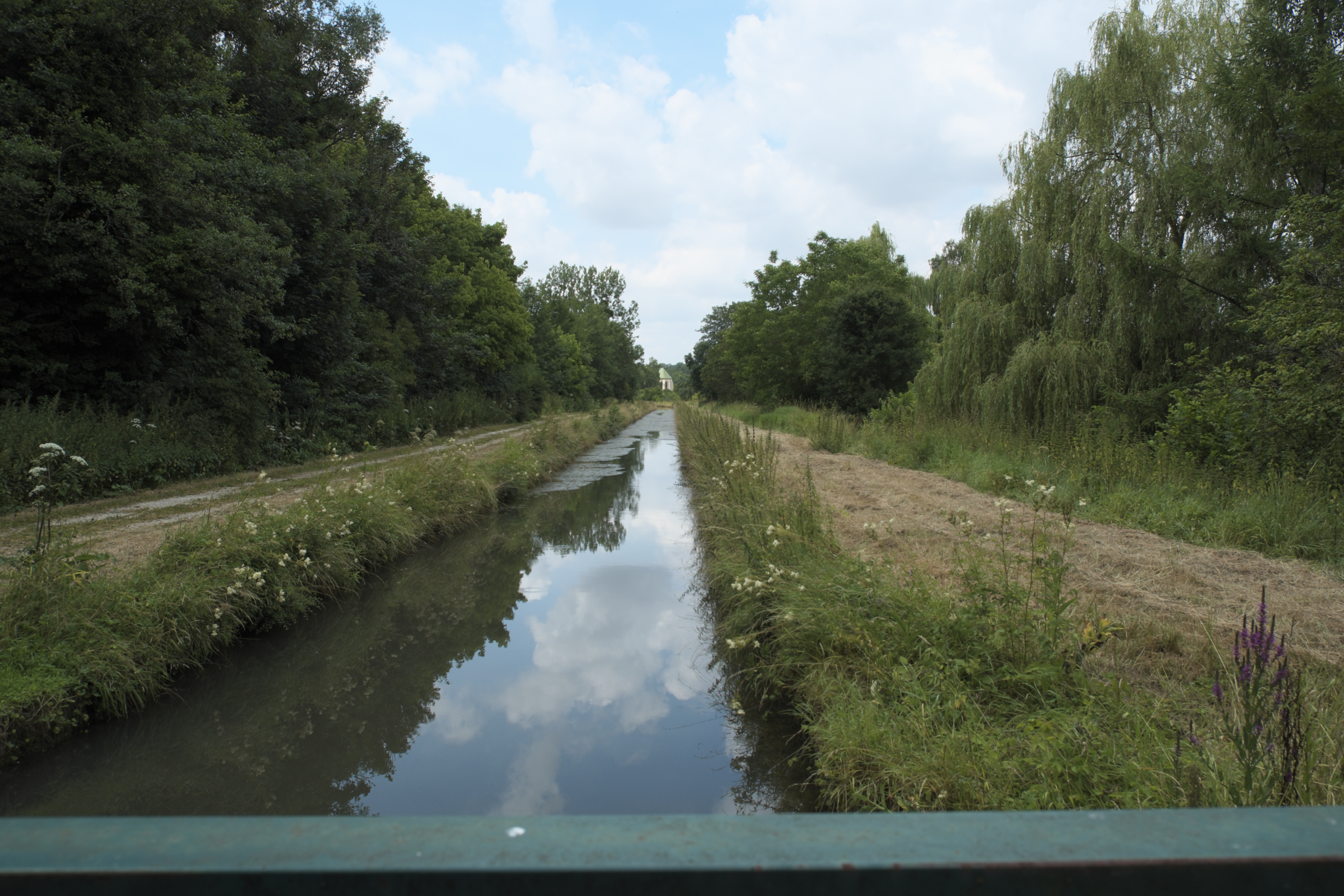
- Interactive map of Canal du Clignon

Specifications
- Length: 1.2 km (0.75 mi)
- Locks: 0

Geography
- Start point: Canal de l'Ourcq in Neufchelles
- End point: Montigny-l'Allier
- Beginning coordinates: 49.11950°N 3.07411°E
- Ending coordinates: 49.11189°N 3.09484°E

The Canal du Clignon (French pronunciation: [kanal dy kliɲɔ̃]) is a canal in northern France connecting Canal de l'Ourcq in Neufchelles to Montigny-l'Allier.

== See also ==
- List of canals in France
