= Marans Canal =

Canal in France

Canal maritime de Marans à la mer

Specifications
- Length: 5 km (3.1 mi)
- Locks: 1

Geography
- Beginning coordinates: 46.31528°N 1.00868°W
- Ending coordinates: 46.31801°N 1.07374°W

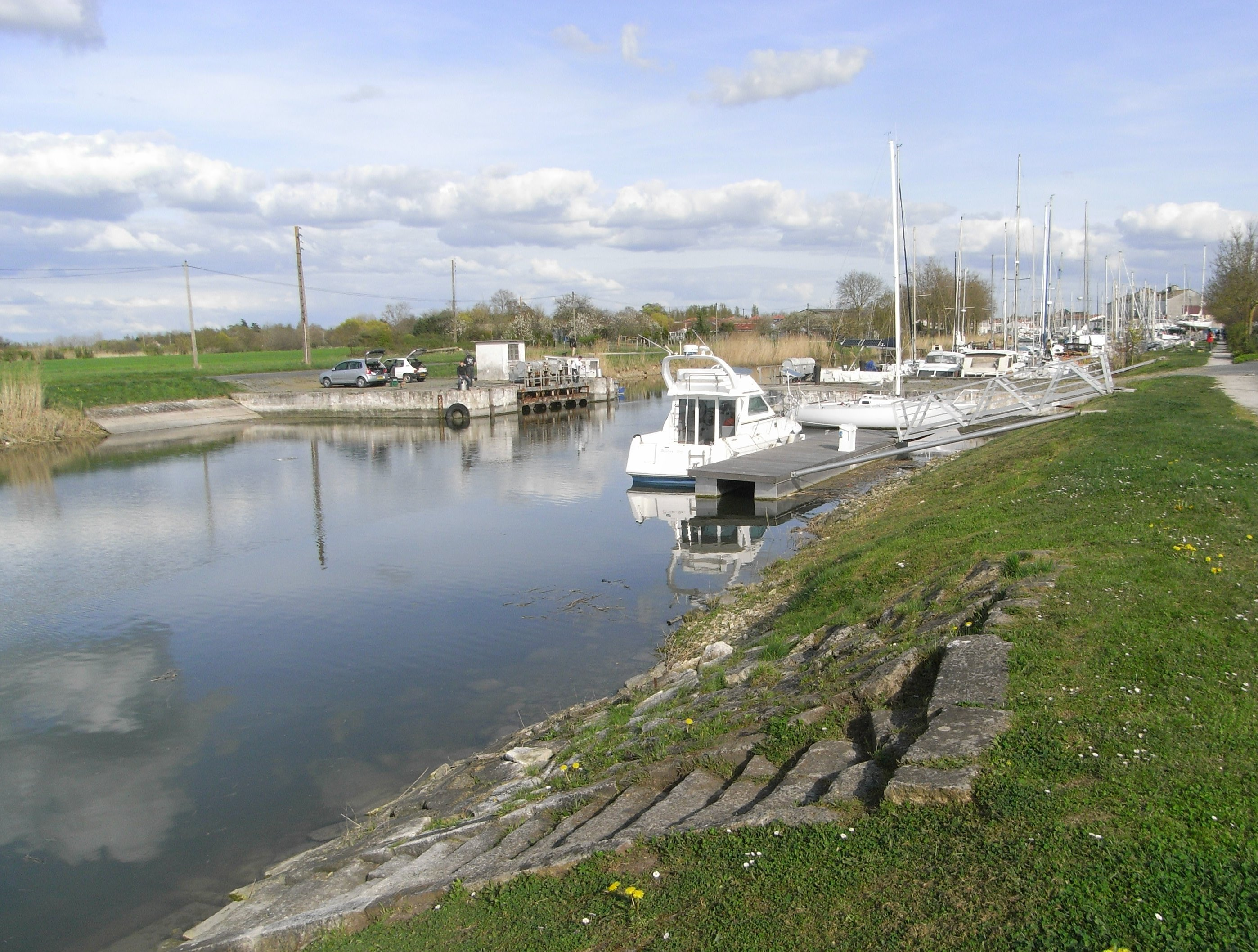
Canal maritime de Marans à la mer

The Canal maritime de Marans à la mer (French pronunciation: [kanal maʁitim də maʁɑ̃ a la mɛʁ], "Marans Ship Canal to the sea") is a canal on France's western shore that connects the Sèvre Niortaise in Marans to the Sèvre Niortaise in Charron. Also known as the Canal Maritime du Brault and Canal de Marans à la Mer, the canal is located in the Charente-Maritime department.

== See also ==
- List of canals in France
