= Charente-Seudre Canal =

Canal in France

Canal de la Charente à la Seudre
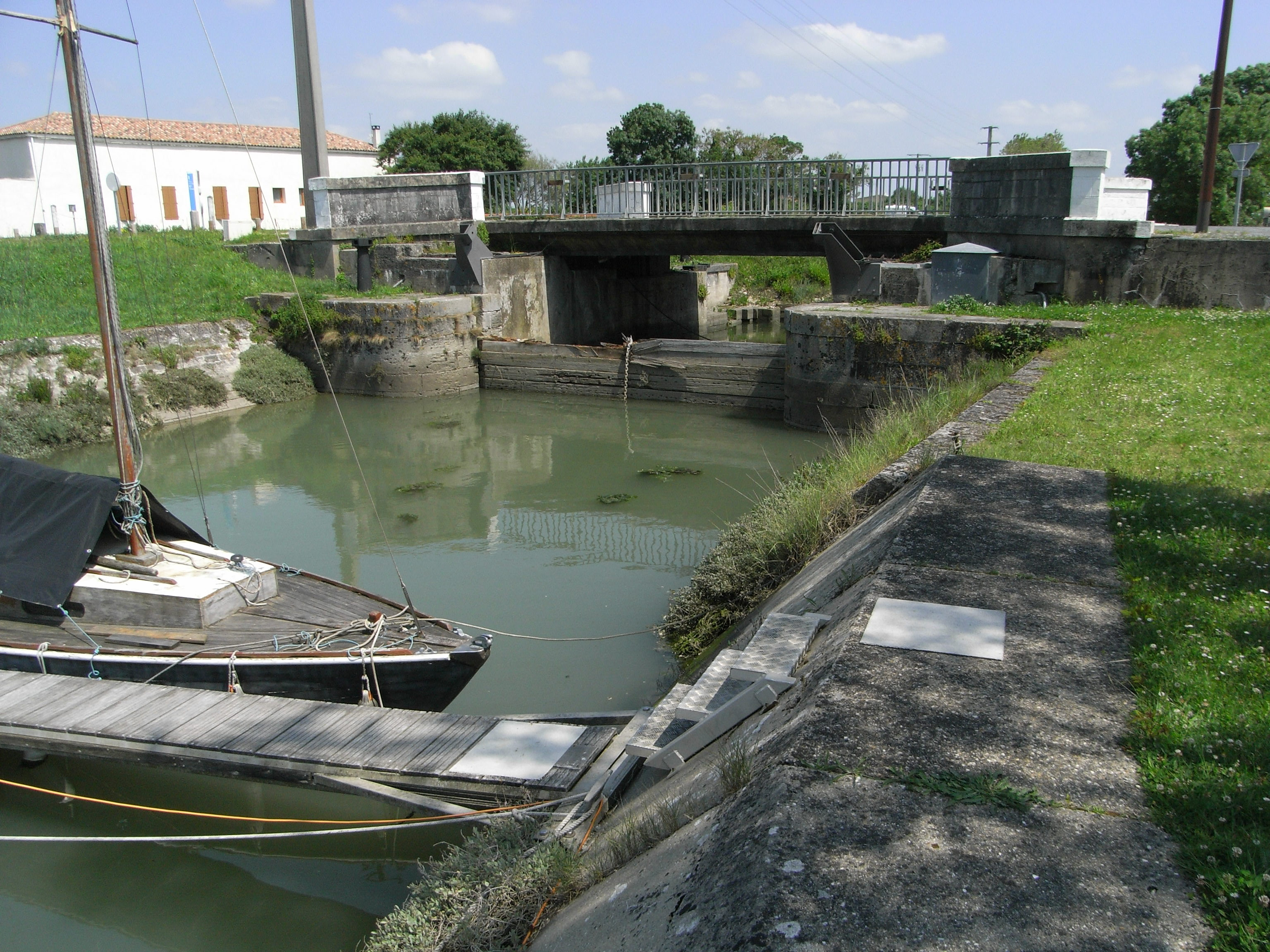
- Last-lock in Marennes (17) Canal Charente Seudre (via the channel Marennnes)

Specifications
- Length: 39 km (24 mi)
- Locks: 5

History
- Date completed: 1812

Geography
- Start point: Charente (river) at Rochefort
- End point: Seudre at Marennes
- Beginning coordinates: 45.93635°N 0.92010°W
- Ending coordinates: 45.79003°N 1.12610°W

The Canal de la Charente à la Seudre (French pronunciation: [kanal də la ʃaʁɑ̃t a la sødʁ]), also called Canal de la Bridoire ([kanal də la bʁidwaʁ]), is a 39 km canal near the western shore of France. It connects the Charente (river) at Rochefort to the Seudre at Marennes.

== See also ==
- List of canals in France
