= Mignon Canal =

Canalised section of the river Mignon in France

Coordinates: 46°18′N 0°47′W

Canal du Mignon

Specifications
- Length: 11 km (6.8 mi)
- Locks: 2

Geography
- Start point: Sèvre Niortaise near La Grève-sur-Mignon
- End point: Mauzé-sur-le-Mignon

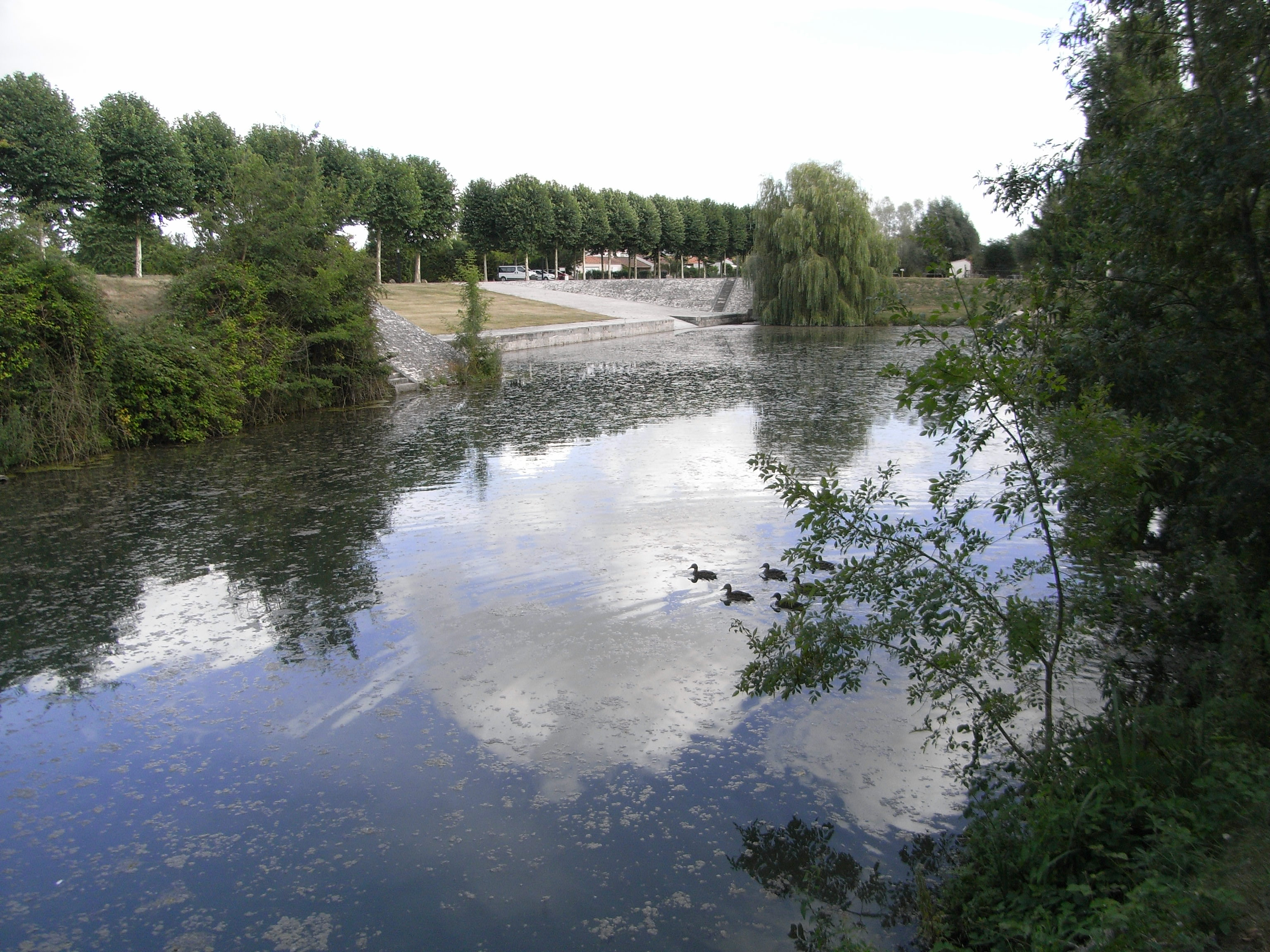
Canal du Mignon

The Canal du Mignon (French pronunciation: [kanal dy miɲɔ̃]) is the canalised lower section of the river Mignon in western France. It connects to the Sèvre Niortaise near La Grève-sur-Mignon with its terminus in Mauzé-sur-le-Mignon. It is 11 km long with two locks.

== See also ==
- List of canals in France
