= Landes Canal =

Canal in southwestern France

Canal des Landes

Specifications
- Length: 15 km (9.3 mi)

Geography
- Direction: North/South
- Start point: Bassin d'Arcachon
- End point: Étang de Biscarrosse
- Beginning coordinates: 44.6471°N 1.1167°W

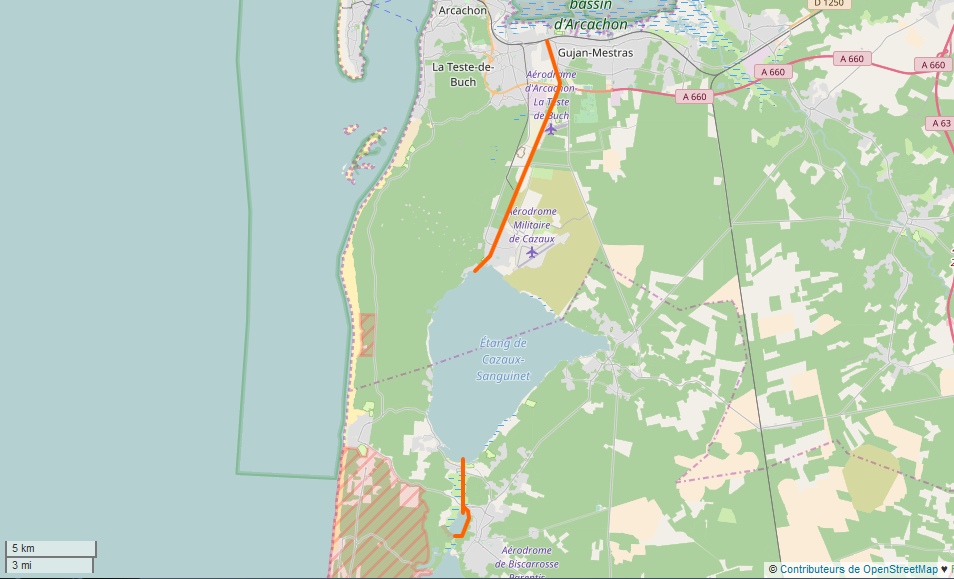
Canal des Landes

The Canal des Landes (French pronunciation: [kanal de lɑ̃d]), also Canal de Cazaux ([kanal də kazo]), is a canal in south western France, Aquitaine Region, connecting the Étang de Biscarrosse and the Étang de Cazaux to the Bassin d'Arcachon.

== See also ==
- List of canals in France
