= Jeune-Autise Canal =

Canalised branch of the river Autize in France

Canal de la Jeune-Autise

Specifications
- Length: 8.5 km (5.3 mi)
- Locks: 1

Geography
- Start point: Souil
- End point: Sèvre Niortaise at Maillé
- Beginning coordinates: 46.40354°N .76415°W
- Ending coordinates: 46.34047°N .79668°W

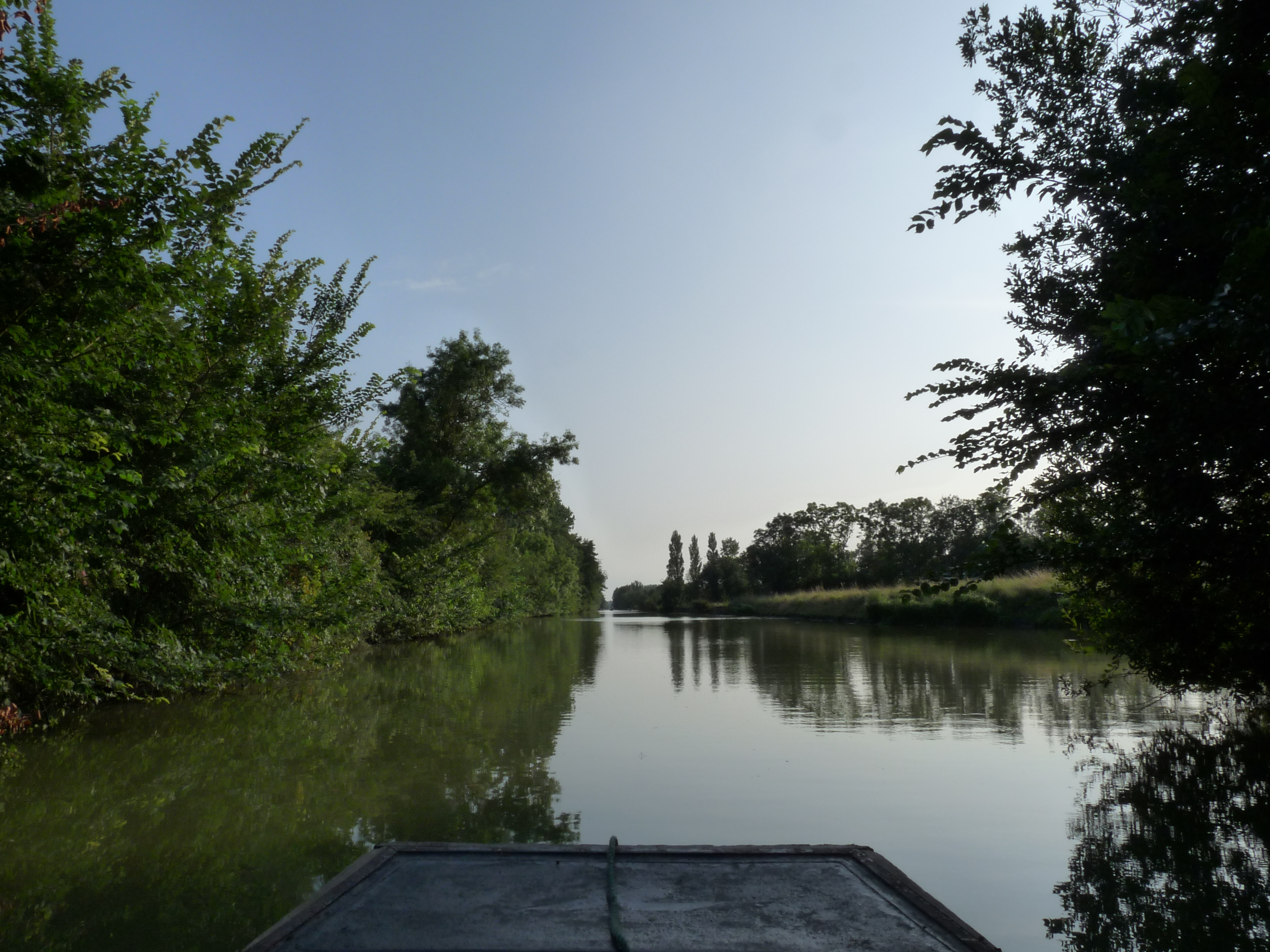
Canal de la Jeune-Autise

The Canal de la Jeune-Autise (French pronunciation: [kanal də la ʒœn otiz], lit. 'Young Autise Canal') is a canalised branch of the river Autise in western France. It connects Souil, north of Saint-Pierre-le-Vieux, to the river Sèvre Niortaise in Maillé. It has one lock and is 8.5 km long.

== See also ==
- List of canals in France
