= Nancy Canal =

Canal in eastern France

Canal de jonction de Nancy

Specifications
- Length: 10.2 km (6.3 mi)
- Locks: 18
- Status: Open

Geography
- Direction: Southwest/Northeast
- Start point: Canal des Vosges at Richardménil
- End point: Canal de la Marne au Rhin at
- Beginning coordinates: 48.6014°N 6.1553°E
- Ending coordinates: 48.6598°N 6.2303°E

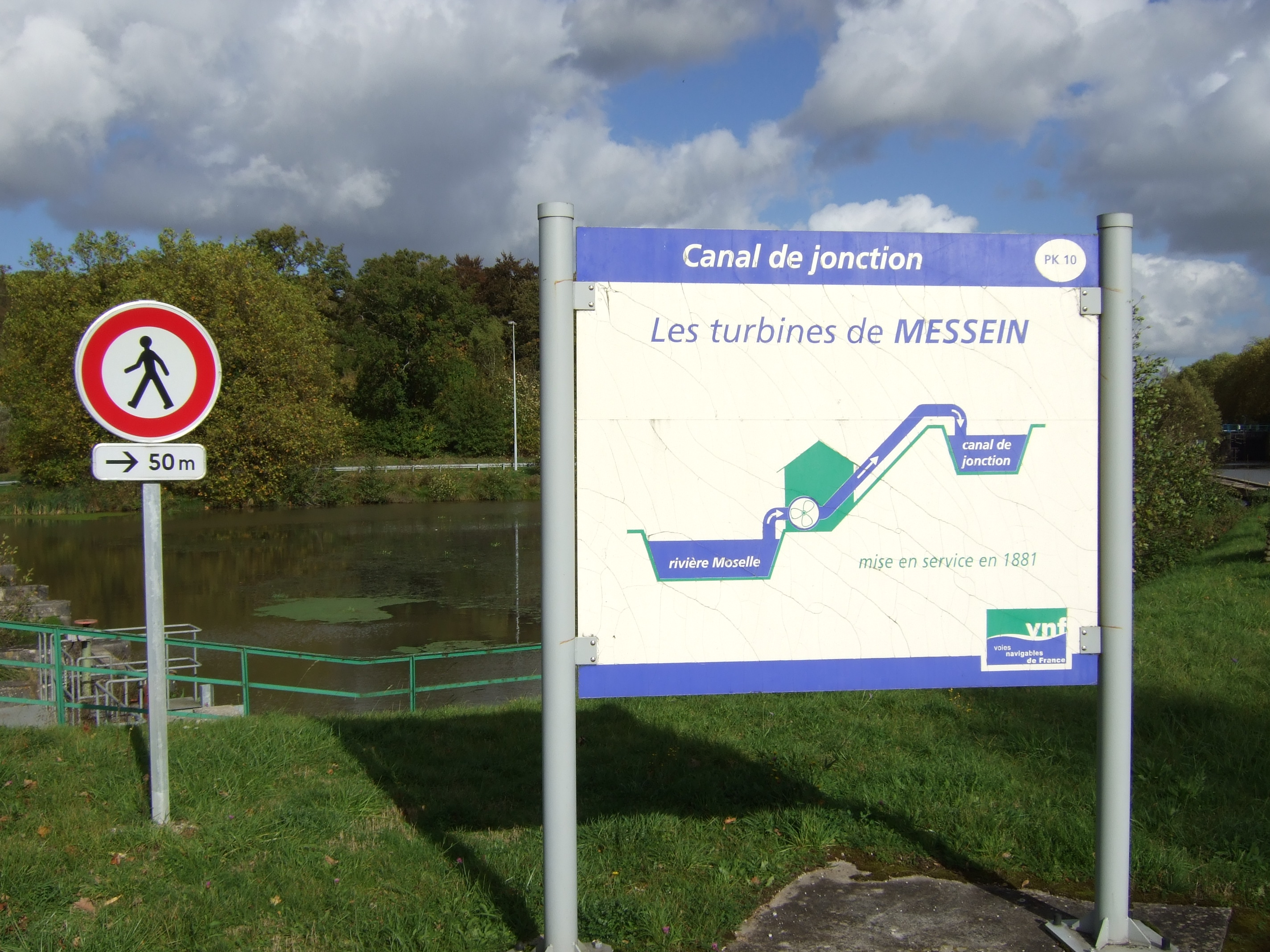
Canal de Jonction de Nancy

The Canal de jonction de Nancy (French pronunciation: [kanal də ʒɔ̃ksjɔ̃ də nɑ̃si]; also Embranchement de Nancy) is a canal in eastern France. It forms a connection between the Canal des Vosges at Richardménil and the Canal de la Marne au Rhin at Laneuveville-devant-Nancy. It was closed due to a collapsed embankment, but it was reopened in 2012. It is 10.2 km long with eighteen locks.

== See also ==
- List of canals in France
