= Brouage Canal =

Canal in France

Coordinates: 45.8578°N 1.0165°W

Canal de Brouage
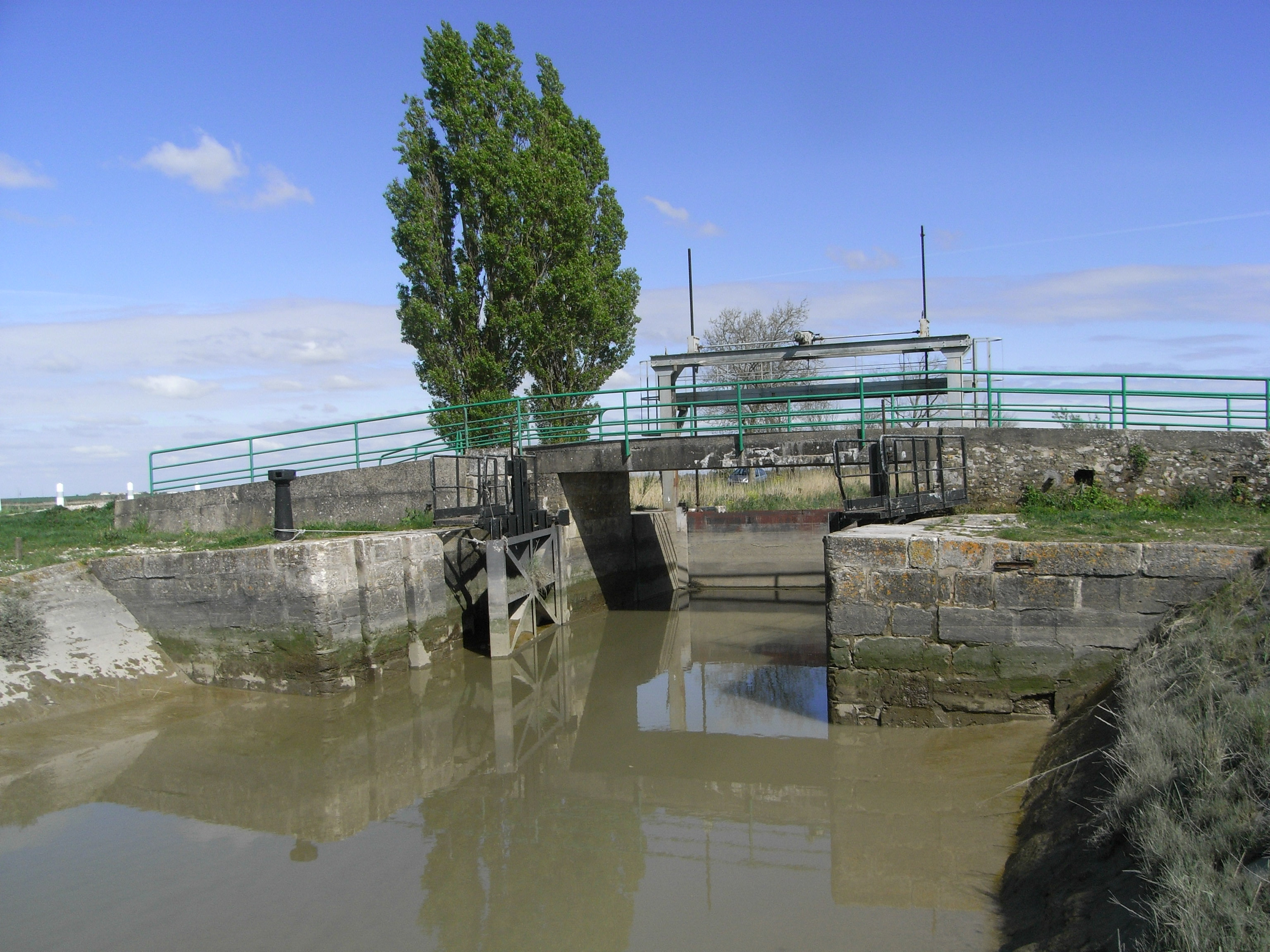
- The Canal Lock Brouage in Charente-Maritime (France). In the foreground Harbor Brouage (the level of the channel varies depending on the tide)
- Interactive map of Canal de Brouage

Specifications
- Length: 2 km (1.2 mi)
- Locks: 1

History
- Construction began: 1782
- Date completed: 1807

The Canal de Brouage (French pronunciation: [kanal də bʁuaʒ]), also known historically as the Canal de Broue, Havre de Brouage, or Course de Blénac, is a 22-kilometre-long (14 mi) waterway in Charente-Maritime, western France. It forms part of the larger Canal de la Charente à la Seudre system by connecting the Charente and Seudre rivers with a branch extending to the historic port of Brouage.

== History ==
=== Vauban's Proposal (1684) ===
Marshal Vauban submitted a project on 6 October 1685 to King Louis XIV for the cleaning of the harbour of Brouage. The project aimed to create a new navigable canal and a water reservoir encompassing the marshes and the valleys of the Arnaise and Arnoult rivers. The king's declaration of 4 April 1687 authorized the digging of two navigable canals: one from the Charente to Cafourche, and another from the Garenne of Saint-Just to the Seudre. The canal intended to facilitate the transport of salt and other goods while also serving military purposes for the new Rochefort arsenal, established in 1666.

=== De Réverseaux's Project (1782) ===
The Council of State issued a decree on 30 October 1782 ordering the draining of the marshy lands surrounding Rochefort, which were causing pestilential diseases. Intendant Guéau de Réverseaux of La Rochelle was placed in charge of draining the lower valley of the Charente and constructing a road from Rochefort to Royan, including a new bridge at Saint-Agnant.

Three major canals were opened which were the Saint-Agnant canal (proposed a century earlier), the Broue canal, and the Mérignac canal. Using 4,000 military laborers, 170 kilometres (110 mi) of canals were dug in just a few years. The Canal de Brouage took over the functions of the earlier New Canal of Saint-Agnant, serving both as a navigable link between the Charente and the Seudre and as a water sluice for cleaning the port of Brouage. Two locks regulated its course: the Bridoire lock and the Brouage lock.

The work was interrupted by the French Revolution and the canals silted up.

=== Restoration under the Empire (1804) ===
Under the Empire, work resumed in 1804. Engineer Masquelez directed the digging of the Brouage canal to the Charente and dredged the Brouage harbor. A wooden wharf was built in 1842.

=== Completion under the Second Empire (1862) ===
The navigable route between the Charente and the Seudre was completed in 1862 during the Second Empire under Napoleon III. The unification of the Broue, Mérignac, and Marennes canals allowed boats to travel from the Seudre to the Charente.

The completed canal generated new economic activities. A chemical factory was established in Marennes in 1864, and stone quarries were opened in the region. Barges transported pyrites and phosphates imported from Tonnay-Charente to the chemical plant. Goods including oysters, salt, soda produced at the Marennes factory and stones from the Carlot quarries were also transported.

=== Modern use ===
Railway lines strongly competed with the river traffic. The canal lost its classification as a navigable waterway in 1927. However, traffic continued until around 1950, primarily for the transport of stones.

== See also ==
- List of canals in France
