= Haute-Saône Canal =

Canal in eastern France

Canal de la Haute-Saône

Specifications
- Length: 10 km (6.2 mi) to Botans, 14.9 km (9.3 mi) to Belfort
- Locks: 5
- Status: Closed

History
- Former names: Canal de Montbéliard à la Haute-Saône
- Construction began: 1882
- Date completed: 1923

Geography
- Direction: East/West
- Start point: Canal du Rhône au Rhin at Allenjoie
- End point: Botans
- Beginning coordinates: 47.5237°N 6.8798°E

The Canal de la Haute-Saône (French pronunciation: [kanal də la ot son]), also canal de Montbéliard à la Haute-Saône ([kanal də mɔ̃beljaʁ a la ot son]), is a canal in eastern France. Although it was designed to connect the upper course of the river Saône (in Conflandey) with the Canal du Rhône au Rhin (in Allenjoie) along Lure and Ronchamp, only the short section between Allenjoie and Botans has been opened in 1923. In the section between Ronchamp and Botans, several locks and tunnels have been built, but it was never used. The section Allenjoie-Botans is 10 km long with five locks. It was closed in 2013.

== See also ==
- List of canals in France
