= Ille-et-Rance Canal =

Canal in France

Coordinates: 48.1106°N 1.6858°W

Canal d'Ille-et-Rance
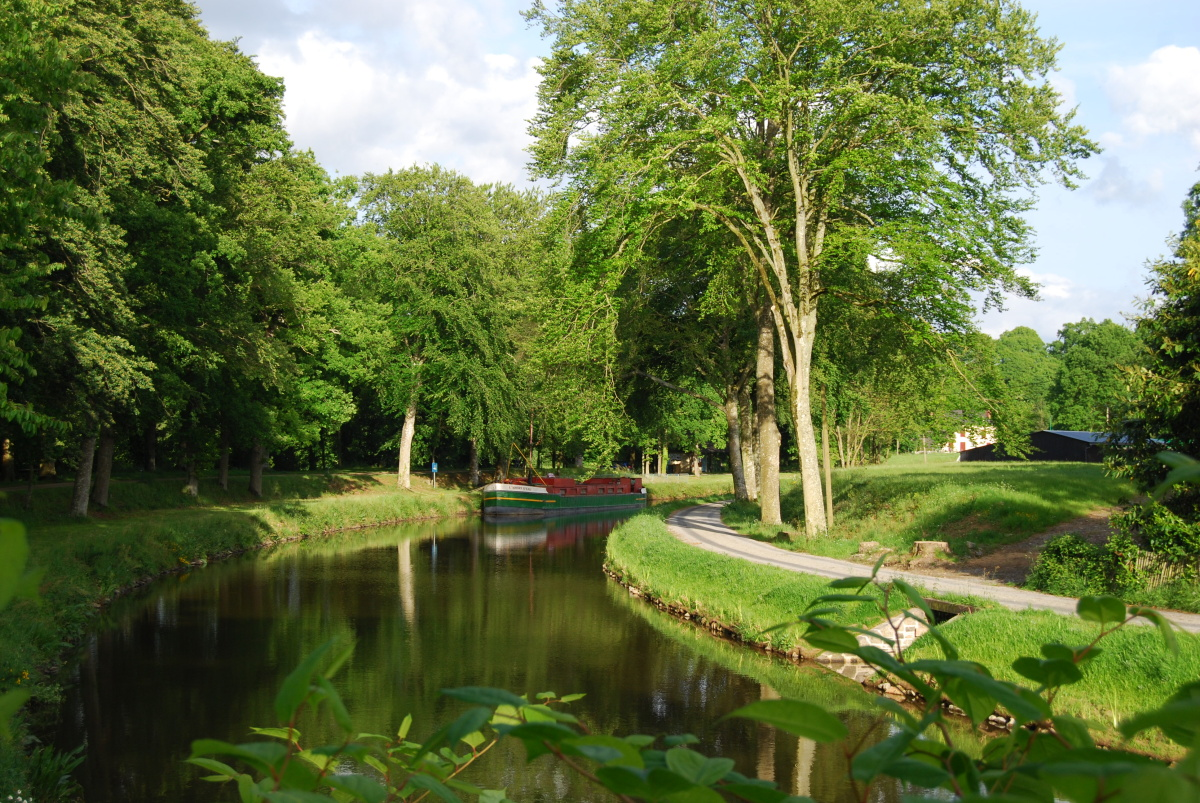
- The Canal d'Ille-et-Rance at Chevaigné

Specifications
- Length: 79 km (49 mi)
- Locks: 47

History
- Construction began: 1804
- Date of first use: 1832

Geography
- Direction: North/South
- Start point: Vilaine at Rennes
- End point: Dinan

The Canal d'Ille-et-Rance (French pronunciation: [kanal dil e ʁɑ̃s], literally Canal of Ille and Rance; Breton: Kanol an Il hag ar Renk) is a 79 km (49 mi) long canal in northwestern France connecting Dinan to the Vilaine at Rennes, thus forming part of the English Channel/Atlantic Ocean link which has long been used by yachtsmen, but has also become increasingly popular as a cruising waterway in its own right. It takes its name from the rivers Ille and Rance. Several hire firms are based on the canal or its connecting waterways. From Dinan the navigation continues in the semi-tidal river Rance for a further 6 km to Le Châtelier lock, below which navigation continues in the tidal Rance maritime. The canal has a summit level 7 km in length at an altitude of 65m, and in times of drought some restrictions may have to be imposed on the use of locks.

Canal d'Ille-et-Rance

== History ==
A canal across Brittany from the Rance estuary to the Vilaine at Rennes was suggested in the 17th century, but the first serious plans were drawn up in 1736. They were incorporated in a project for three canals in the Province, but nothing was done until Napoleon ordered implementation of all three schemes in 1804. Works started, but were interrupted after his defeat. A private company took up the concession to build the canal and started work in 1822. The canal was opened in 1834.

Canal ownership was transferred from the State to Brittany Region in 2010.

== See also ==
- List of canals in France
