= Grand Morin Canal =

Canal in northern France

Canal du Grand Morin
- Interactive map of Canal du Grand Morin

Specifications
- Status: Disused

History
- Date closed: 1925

Geography
- Start point: Saint-Germain-sur-Morin / Couilly-Pont-aux-Dames
- End point: Esbly
- Beginning coordinates: 48.8847°N 2.8535°E
- Ending coordinates: 48.8993°N 2.8142°E
- Connects to: Canal de Meaux à Chalifert, Grand Morin

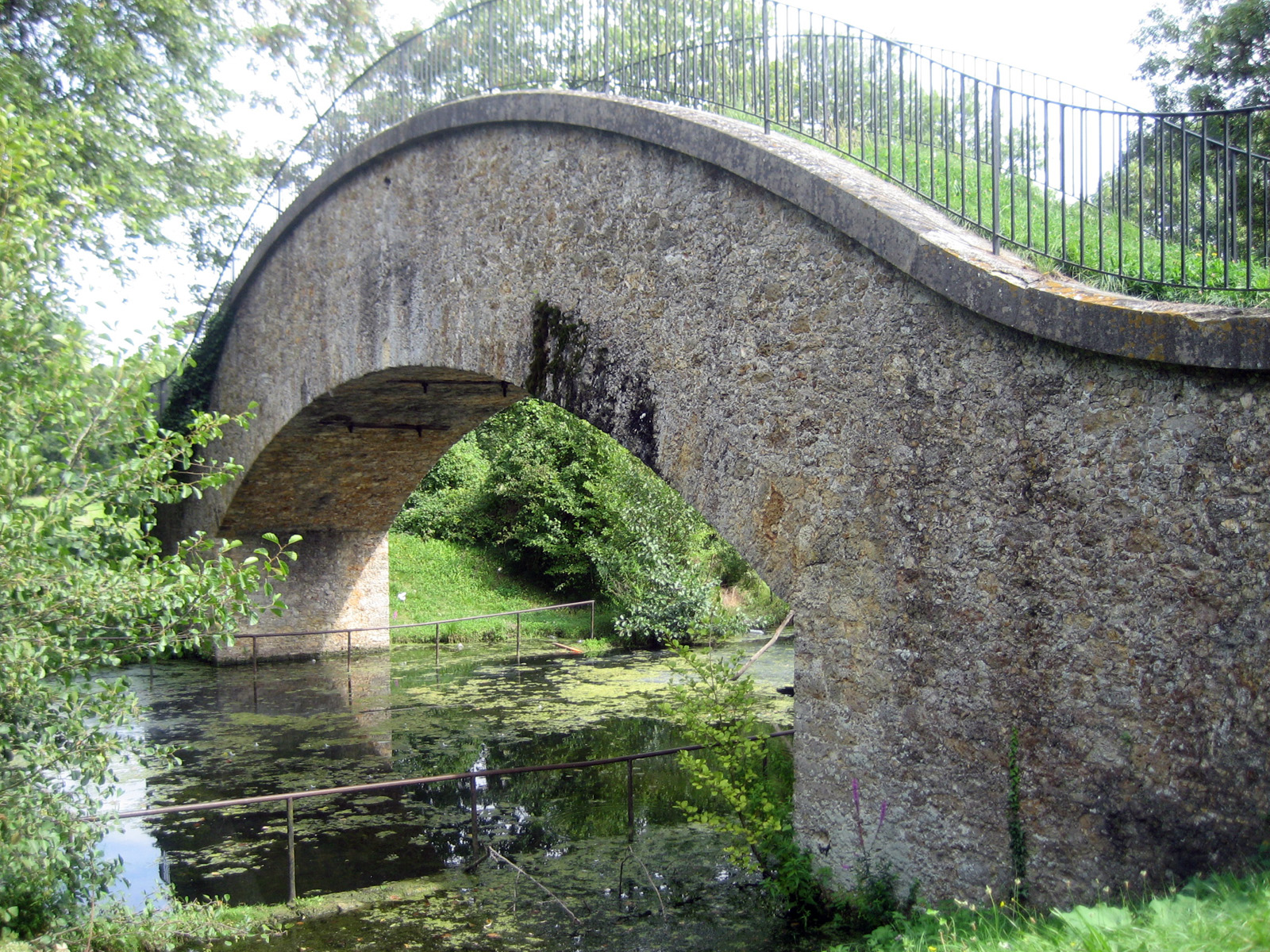
Canal du Grand Morin

The Canal du Grand Morin (French pronunciation: [kanal dy ɡʁɑ̃ mɔʁɛ̃]) is a canal in northern France, near Paris, that connected the Grand Morin River to the Canal de Meaux à Chalifert. Today it serves largely as a feeder canal to the Canal de Meaux à Chalifert.

== See also ==
- List of canals in France
