= Kembs-Niffer Branch Canal =

Specifications
- Length: 13 km (8.1 mi)
- Locks: 0

Geography
- Start point: Between Kembs and Niffer
- Beginning coordinates: 47.70427°N 7.50452°E
- Connects to: Grand Canal d'Alsace, Canal du Rhône au Rhin

The Kembs-Niffer Branch Canal is a French canal connecting the Grand Canal d'Alsace at Kembs to the Canal du Rhône au Rhin.

== See also ==
- List of canals in France
