= Moselle Iron Mines Canal =

Canal in northeastern France

Canal des mines de fer de la Moselle

Specifications
- Length: 30 km (19 mi)
- Locks: 4

History
- Construction began: 1929
- Date completed: 1932

Geography
- Direction: North/South
- Start point: Metz
- End point: Thionville
- Ending coordinates: 49.3509°N 6.1610°E

The Canal des mines de fer de la Moselle (English: Canal of the Iron Mines of Moselle) is a canal in north eastern France linking Metz and Thionville. It is a canalized section of the river Moselle. The canal may also be called CAMIFEMO as concocted from the name of the canal in the following way: CAnal des MInes de FEr de la MOselle (CAMIFEMO).

== See also ==
- List of canals in France
