= Beuvry Canal =

Canal in northern France

Coordinates: 50°33′N 2°38′E

Canal de Beuvry
- Interactive map of Canal de Beuvry

Specifications
- Length: .6 km (0.37 mi)
- Status: Disused

Geography
- Connects to: Canal Dunkerque-Escaut

The Canal de Beuvry is a canal in northern France connecting to the Canal Dunkerque-Escaut but no longer navigable all the way to Beuvry. With the loss of the coal industry in this area, the canal is no longer used.

== See also ==
- List of canals in France
