= Lens Canal =

Canal in northern France

Canal de Lens

Specifications
- Length: 8 km (5.0 mi)
- Locks: 0

Geography
- Start point: Lens
- End point: Oignies
- Beginning coordinates: 50.43367°N 2.85181°E
- Ending coordinates: 50.46909°N 2.94743°E
- Connects to: Canal de la Deûle west of Oignies

The Canal de Lens (French pronunciation: [kanal də lɑ̃s]) is a canal in northern France. It connects Lens to the Canal de la Deûle west of Oignies. It is 8 km long with no locks.

== See also ==
- List of canals in France
