= Roanne–Digoin Canal =

Canal in central France

Canal de Roanne à Digoin
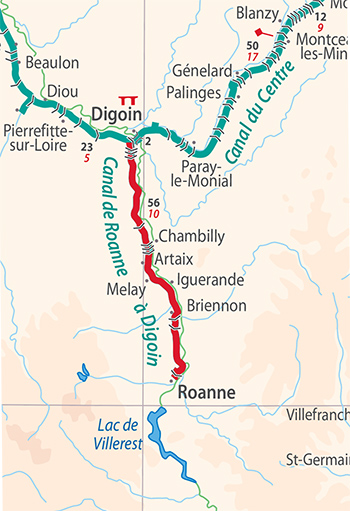

Specifications
- Length: 55.6 km (34.5 mi)
- Locks: 10

History
- Current owner: Voies Navigables de France
- Date approved: 1827
- Construction began: 1831
- Date completed: 1838

Geography
- Start point: Digoin
- End point: Roanne
- Beginning coordinates: 46°28′19″N 3°58′00″E
- Ending coordinates: 46°02′06″N 4°04′54″E
- Connects to: Canal latéral à la Loire and Canal du Centre

The Canal de Roanne à Digoin (French pronunciation: [kanal də ʁɔan a diɡwɛ̃]) connects the Canal latéral à la Loire and Canal du Centre at Digoin to Roanne.

== History ==
This canal was needed to bypass the Loire, which offered inadequate navigable conditions, at the same time serving as a feeder to the Canal latéral à la Loire. The canal was conceded to the Compagnie Franco-Suisse, founded in 1827, and designed by engineer De Varaigne. Works started in 1831 and the canal was inaugurated in 1838. Modernisation to Freycinet standards was designed by engineer Léonce-Abel Mazoyer after the State bought back the canal from the concessionary in 1863. The canal was upgraded to Freycinet standard between 1891 and 1899. The water supply dam and reservoir was completed in 1905

== Development ==
The canal is now used only by private boats and some hire boats. Its development as a tourist asset for the region is actively promoted by the Association "Le Canal de Roanne à Digoin" set up in 2011.

== See also ==
- List of canals in France
