= Nieppe Canal =

Canal in France

Coordinates: 50°39′N 2°28′E

Canal de la Nieppe

Specifications
- Length: 23 km (14 mi)
- Locks: 4
- Status: Closed

History
- Date closed: 1970

Geography
- Start point: River Lys at Thiennes
- End point: River Lys at Merville

The Canal de la Nieppe (French pronunciation: [kanal də la njɛp]) was part of the Hazebrouck Canals (French: Canaux d'Hazebrouck). It connected to the River Lys at Thiennes with a second connection to the River Lys at Merville. It was 23 km with 4 locks. The other canals composing the Hazebrouck canals are the Canal de Préaven, Canal de la Bourre, Canal d'Hazebrouck.

== See also ==
- List of canals in France
