= Lorraines Branch =

Canal in central France

Specifications
- Length: 3 km (1.9 mi)
- Locks: 0
- Status: Disused

Geography
- Start point: Allier River
- End point: Canal latéral à la Loire
- Beginning coordinates: 46.92230°N 3.05572°E
- Ending coordinates: 46.92389°N 3.05695°E
- Branch of: Canal latéral à la Loire

The Lorraines Branch is a canal in central France, some 50 km east of Bourges. It is a disused branch of the Canal latéral à la Loire now serving as a feeder from the Allier River. At one time it carried traffic from the Allier via a circular lock. The Ecluse de Lorraines was 32 m in diameter with three gates providing access from the river on two levels above and below a weir.

== See also ==
- List of canals in France
