= Pont-de-Vaux Canal =

Canal in eastern France

Canal de Pont-de-Vaux

Specifications
- Length: 3 km (1.9 mi)
- Status: Open

History
- Current owner: VNF
- Original owner: Louis Auguste Bertin
- Principal engineer: Leonard Racle
- Construction began: 1783
- Date restored: 1993

Geography
- Direction: East/West
- Beginning coordinates: 46.43311°N 4.93546°E
- Ending coordinates: 46.44705°N 4.89902°E
- Connects to: Saône

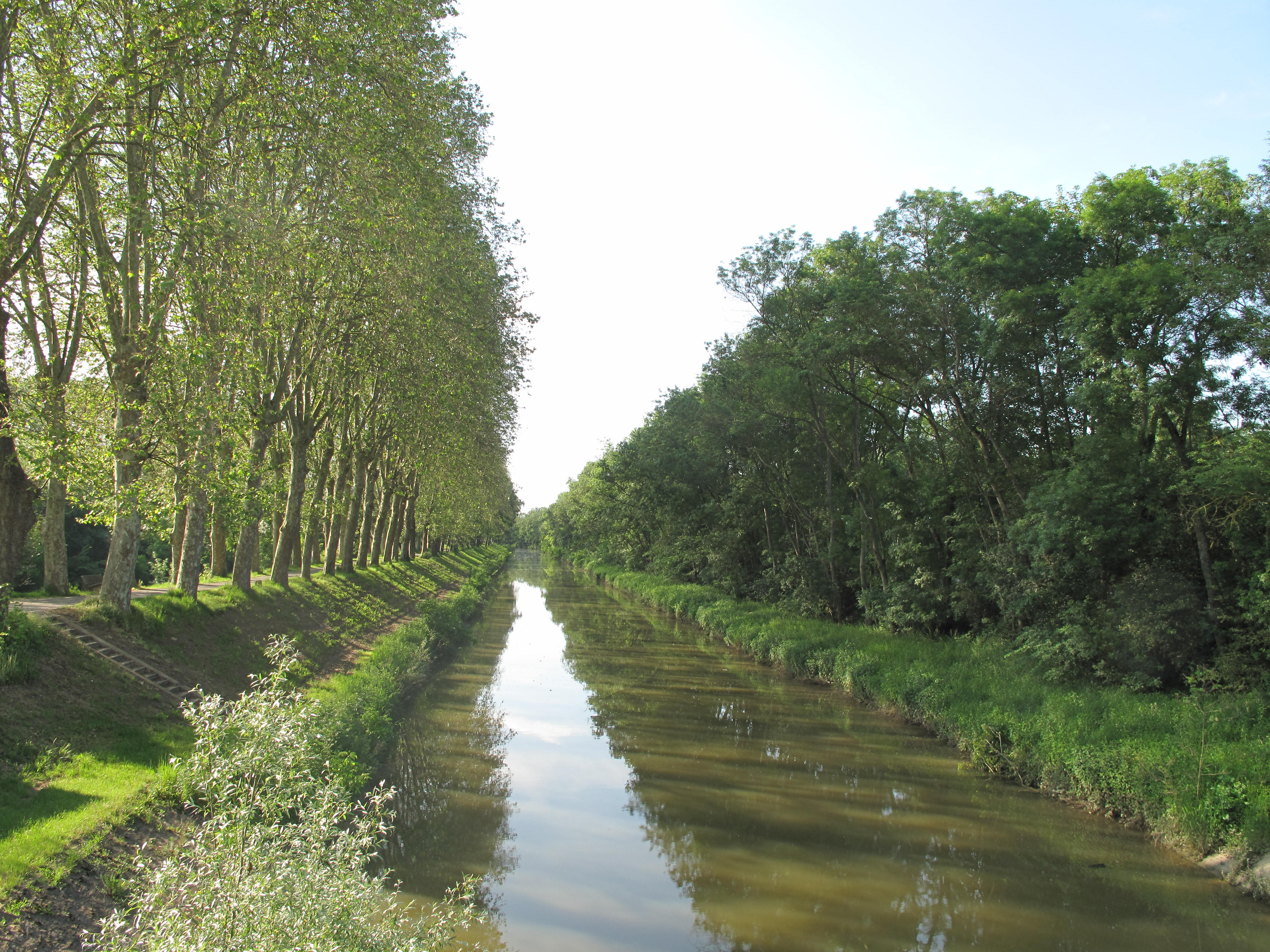
Pont-de-Vaux (Ain, France)

The Canal de Pont-de-Vaux (French pronunciation: [kanal də pɔ̃ də vo]) is a canal in eastern France connecting the Saône at Fleurville to Pont-de-Vaux. It was closed for many years and reopened in 1993. It runs parallel to the Reyssouze River.

== See also ==
- List of canals in France
