= Chelles Canal =

Canal in France

Canal de Chelles
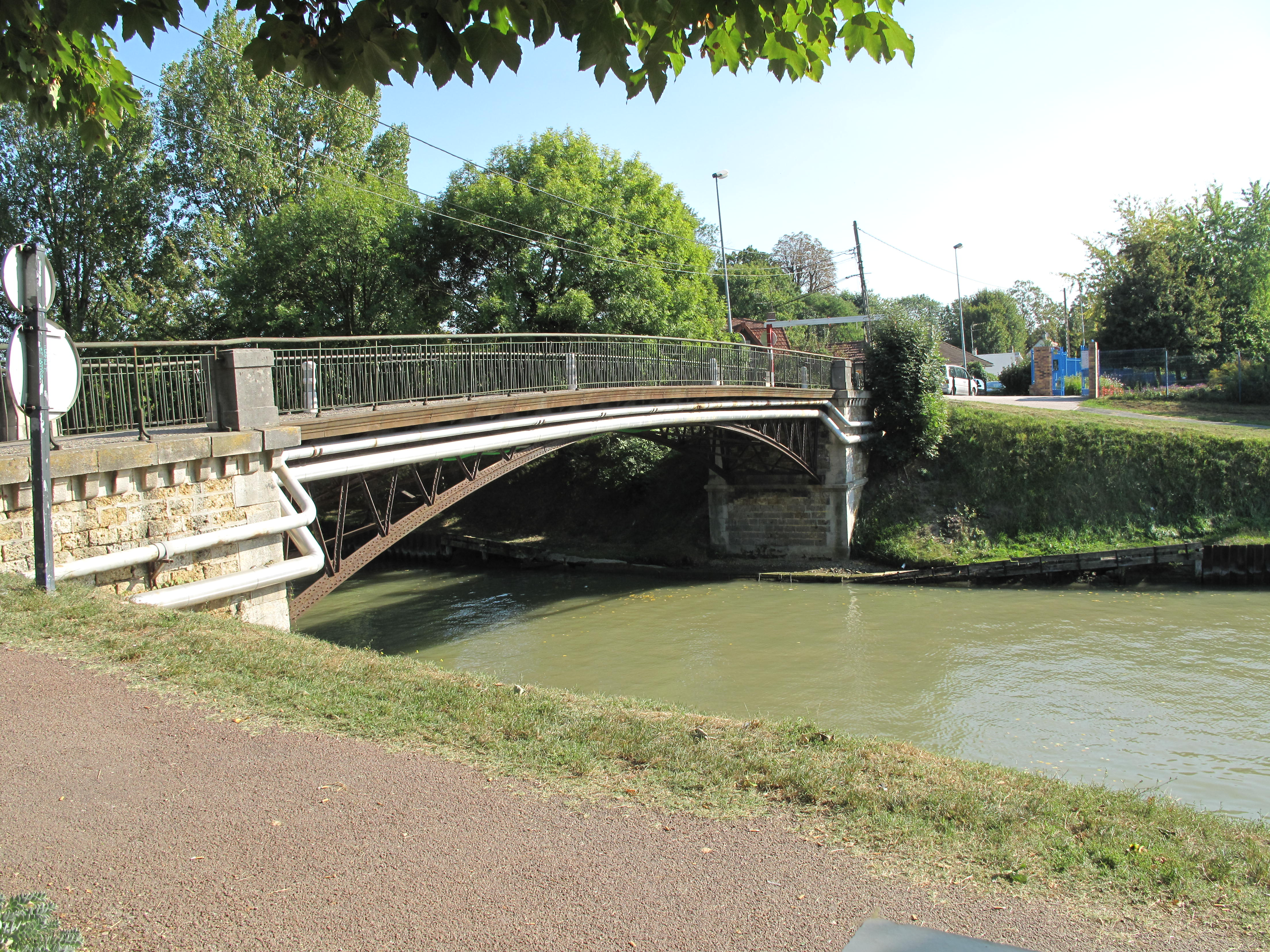
- Bridge over the canal in Chelles

Specifications
- Length: 8.5 km (5.3 mi)

History
- Construction began: 1848
- Date completed: 1865

Geography
- Start point: Marne River in Neuilly-sur-Marne
- End point: Marne River in Vaires-sur-Marne
- Beginning coordinates: 48.85421°N 2.53595°E
- Ending coordinates: = 48.86878°N 2.65097°E
- Connects to: Marne River

The Canal de Chelles (French pronunciation: [kanal də ʃɛl]; or Canal de Vaires à Neuilly-sur-Marne [kanal də vɛʁ a nœji syʁ maʁn]) is a channel parallel to the Marne River. It connects the Marne River in Neuilly-sur-Marne to the Marne River in Vaires-sur-Marne.

Construction began in 1848 when the government of the young Second Republic created the National Workshops to employ the unemployed. The work was abandoned shortly after due to lack of funding. It was started anew under Second Empire. The canal was opened in 1865.

== See also ==
- List of canals in France
