= Colmar Canal =

Canal in eastern France

Colmar Canal Canal de Colmar
- Interactive map of Colmar Canal; Canal de Colmar

Specifications
- Length: 23 km (14 mi)

Geography
- Start point: Colmar
- End point: Rhine at Biesheim
- Beginning coordinates: 48.0802°N 7.3729°E
- Ending coordinates: 48.0328°N 7.5651°E

The Colmar Canal (French: Canal de Colmar) or the Colmar branch of the Rhône–Rhine Canal (French: embranchement de Colmar) (French pronunciation: [ɑ̃bʁɑ̃ʃmɑ̃ də kɔlmaʁ]) is a canal in eastern France. It connects Colmar to the Rhine at Biesheim. It is 23 km long with three locks.

It was inaugurated on 13 November 1864.

== See also ==
- List of canals in France
