= Henri IV Canal =

Canal Henri IV

Specifications
- Length: 1.5 km (0.93 mi)
- Locks: 3

Geography
- Start point: Loire in Briare
- End point: Canal de Briare outside Briare
- Beginning coordinates: 47.63925°N 2.73062°E
- Ending coordinates: 47.64723°N 2.75894°E
- Branch of: Canal de Briare
- Connects to: Canal latéral à la Loire, Loire

The Canal Henri IV is a section of the Canal de Briare that connects the Loire to the remainder of the Canal de Briare in Briare. It joins the Canal de Briare at the same point as the Canal latéral à la Loire.

== See also ==
- List of canals in France
- Canal de Briare
