= Charron, Charente-Maritime =

Charron
- Commune
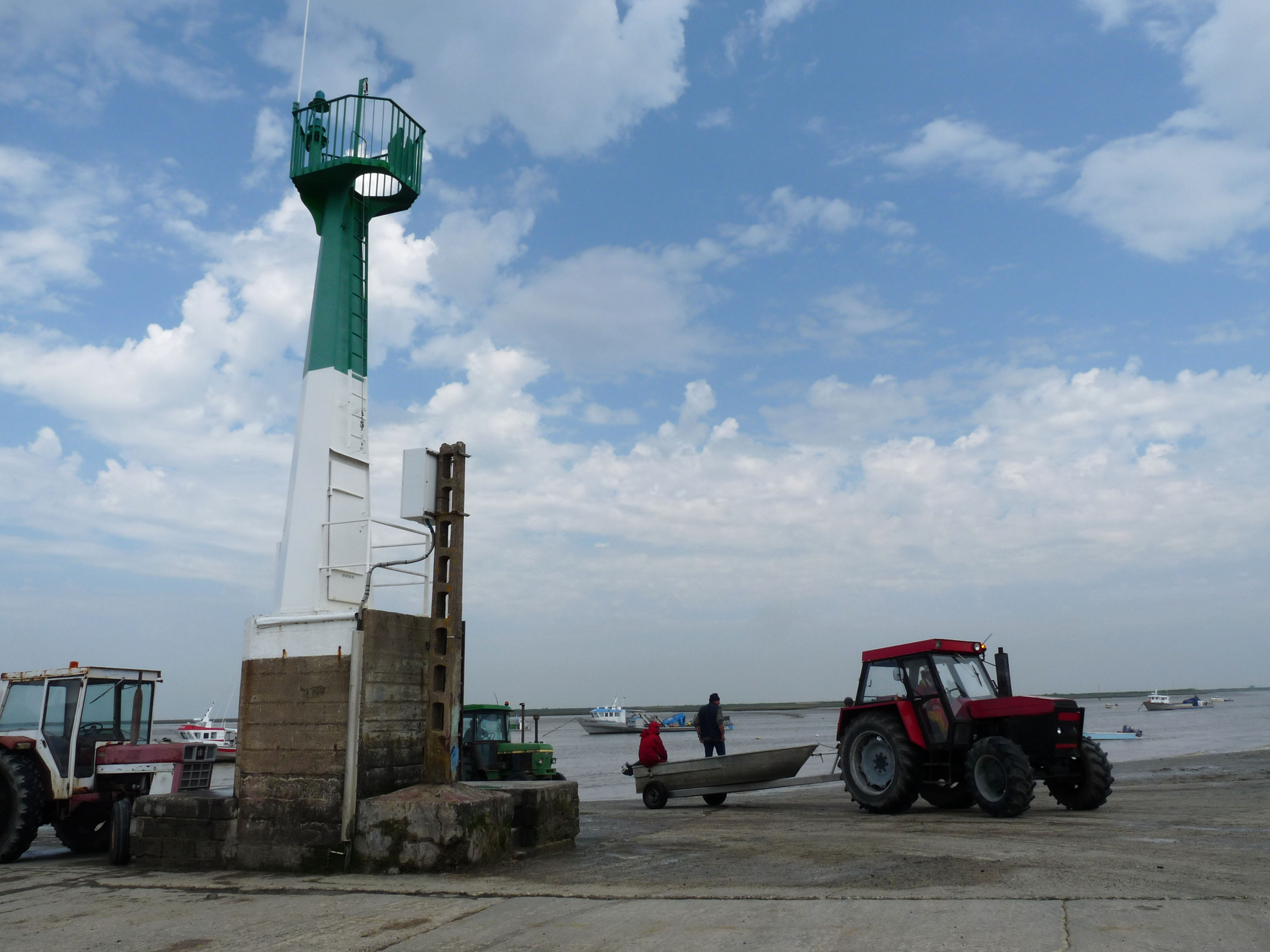
- Port du Pavé

- Coat of arms
- Location of Charron
- Location within France Location within Nouvelle-Aquitaine
- Coordinates: 46°17′43″N 1°06′18″W
- Country: France
- Region: Nouvelle-Aquitaine
- Department: Charente-Maritime
- Arrondissement: La Rochelle
- Canton: Marans

Government
  - Mayor (2023–2026): Martine Boutet
- Area^{1}: 37.54 km^{2} (14.49 sq mi)
- Highest elevation: 11 m (36 ft)
- Lowest elevation: 0 m (0 ft)
- Population (2023): 2,021
  - Density: 53.84/km^{2} (139.4/sq mi)
- Time zone: UTC+01:00 (CET)
  - Summer (DST): UTC+02:00 (CEST)
- INSEE/Postal code: 17091 /17230
- ^{1} French Land Register data, which excludes lakes, ponds, glaciers > 1 km^{2} (0.386 sq mi or 247 acres) and river estuaries.

Charron (French pronunciation: [ʃaʁɔ̃]) is a commune in the Charente-Maritime department in the Nouvelle-Aquitaine region in southwestern France. It is situated at the outflow of the Sèvre Niortaise into the Atlantic Ocean.

== Population ==
Historical population
Year	Pop.	±% p.a.
1968	1,337	—
1975	1,444	+1.11%
1982	1,538	+0.91%
1990	1,512	−0.21%
1999	1,650	+0.98%
2007	2,220	+3.78%
2012	1,896	−3.11%
2017	1,989	+0.96%
2023	2,021	+0.27%
Source: INSEE

== See also ==
- Communes of the Charente-Maritime department
