= Rance Maritime =

Canal in France

Specifications
- Length: 22.6 km (14.0 mi)
- Locks: 2

Geography
- Start point: Saint Malo
- End point: Dinan

The Rance Maritime is a canal in north western France. It joins Saint Malo and Dinan. It is 22.6 km long with two locks.

One set of locks, at the Saint Malo side, replaced the old gate type locks with revolutionary curves locks in 1952, where each lock pivots on one point and are easier to open and close.

== See also ==
- List of canals in France
