= Richardménil =

- Commune
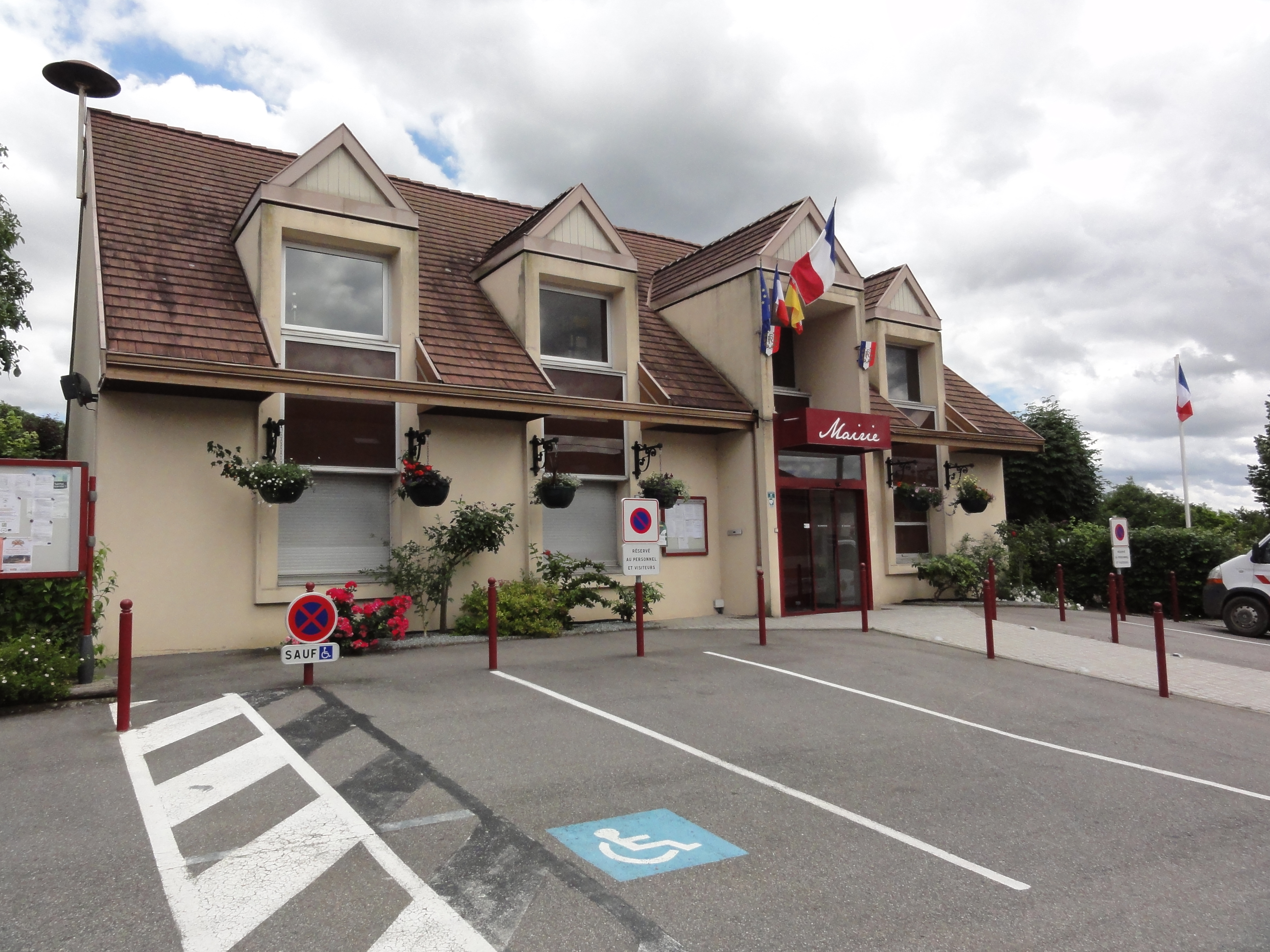
- The town hall in Richardménil

- Coat of arms
- Location of Richardménil
- Location within France Location within Grand Est
- Coordinates: 48°35′41″N 6°10′11″E
- Country: France
- Region: Grand Est
- Department: Meurthe-et-Moselle
- Arrondissement: Nancy
- Canton: Neuves-Maisons
- Intercommunality: Moselle et Madon

Government
  - Mayor (2020–2026): Xavier Boussert
- Area^{1}: 7.17 km^{2} (2.77 sq mi)
- Elevation: 259 m (850 ft)
- Highest elevation: 315 m (1,033 ft)
- Lowest elevation: 222 m (728 ft)
- Population (2023): 2,389
  - Density: 333/km^{2} (863/sq mi)
- Time zone: UTC+01:00 (CET)
  - Summer (DST): UTC+02:00 (CEST)
- INSEE/Postal code: 54459 /54630
- ^{1} French Land Register data, which excludes lakes, ponds, glaciers > 1 km^{2} (0.386 sq mi or 247 acres) and river estuaries.

Richardménil (French pronunciation: [ʁiʃaʁmenil]) is a commune in the Meurthe-et-Moselle department in north-eastern France, near Nancy.

== Governance ==
List of mayors

Term	Name
March 1814	Antoine Drappier
1989–1995	Christian Coignus
1995–2008	René Colotte
2008–2014	Henri Noirel
2014–2026	Xavier Boussert

== Demography ==
Historical population
Year	Pop.	±% p.a.
1968	628	—
1975	1,104	+8.39%
1982	2,479	+12.25%
1990	3,040	+2.58%
1999	2,889	−0.56%
2007	2,575	−1.43%
2012	2,422	−1.22%
2017	2,355	−0.56%
2023	2,389	+0.24%
Source: INSEE

== Patrimony ==
Richardménil has 2 castles. One is still inhabited, the second one was destroyed during the Second World War

== See also ==
- Communes of the Meurthe-et-Moselle department
