= Meaux-Chalifert Canal =

Canal in Île-de-France, France

Canal de Meaux à Chalifert

Specifications
- Length: 12 km (7.5 mi)
- Locks: 0

History
- Construction began: 1837
- Date of first use: 1846

Geography
- Direction: NE to SW
- Start point: Meaux
- End point: Chalifert
- Beginning coordinates: 48.95086°N 2.88168°E
- Ending coordinates: 48.89852°N 2.76984°E
- Connects to: Marne River

The Canal de Meaux à Chalifert (French pronunciation: [kanal də mo a ʃalifɛʁ]) is a canal in northern France connecting the Marne River at Meaux to the Marne at Chalifert. At Lesches there is a 290 m (950 ft) canal tunnel.

== See also ==
- List of canals in France
