= Port de la Robine =

Coordinates: 43.28190°N 2.91837°E

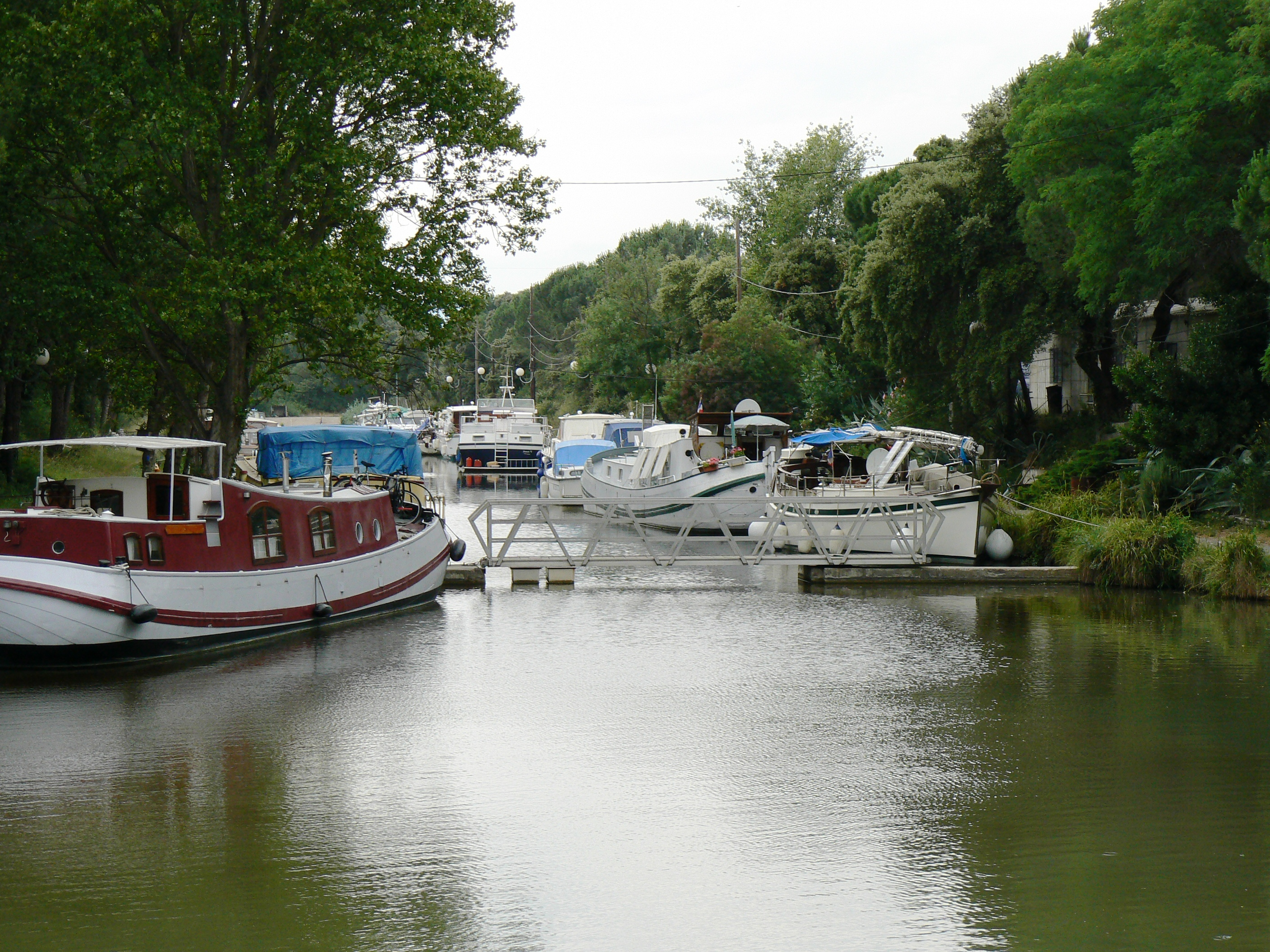
Marina at Port de la Robine

The Port de la Robine is located at PK168 on the Canal du Midi immediately adjacent to the Truilhas Bridge. The turn for the La Nouvelle branch is .5 km (1,600 ft) north east and the Cesse aqueduct .5 km (1,600 ft) south west.

There is room for 80 boats. Facilities include parking, sanitation, fuel, and security. Map

== Gallery ==
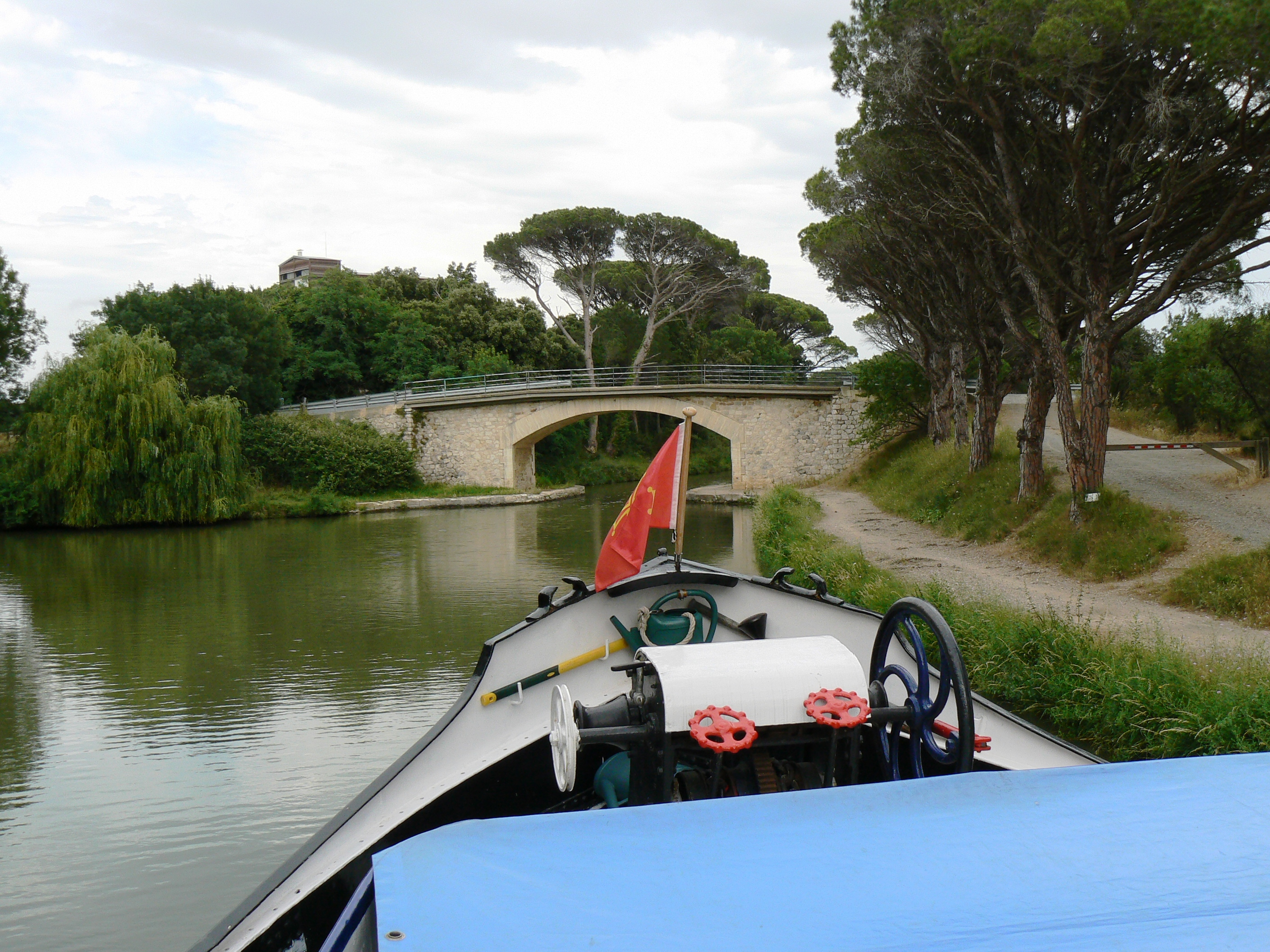
Truilhas Bridge

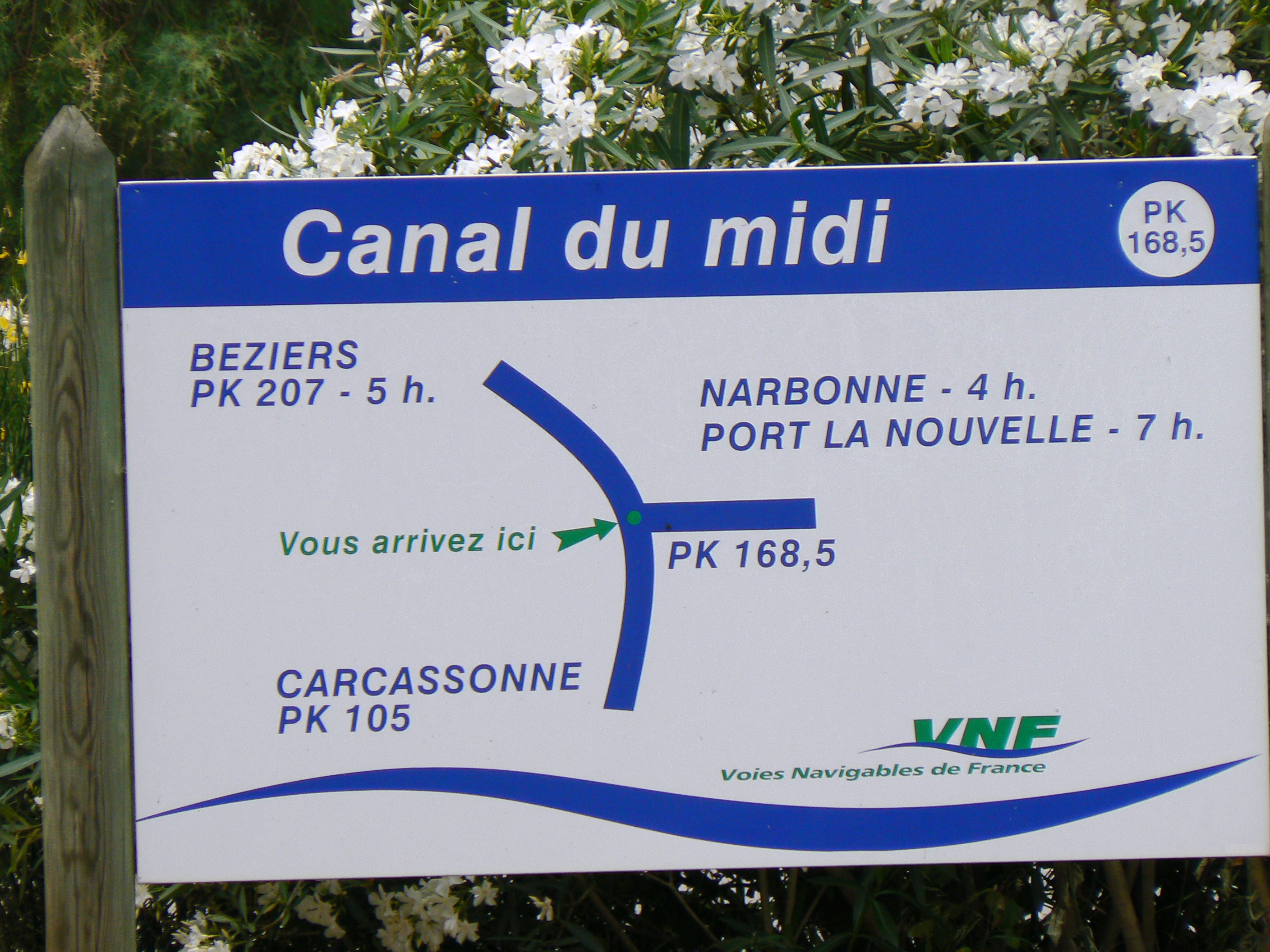
You are here
