= Lac de Biscarrosse et de Parentis =

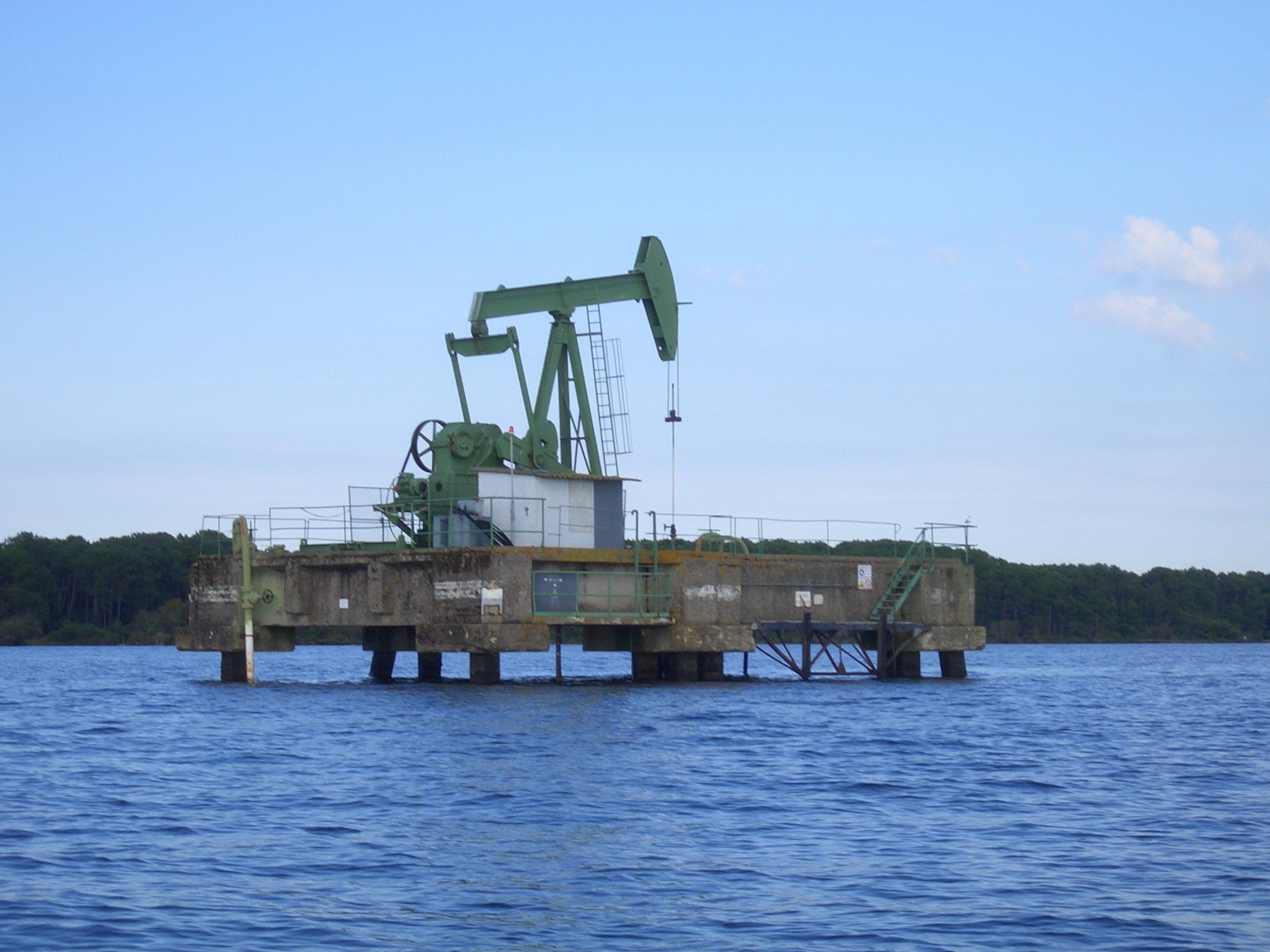

- Location within Nouvelle-Aquitaine
- Location: Landes
- Coordinates: 44°21′N 1°10′W
- Type: Natural lake
- Basin countries: France
- Max. length: 9.53 km (5.92 mi)
- Max. width: 8.47 km (5.26 mi)
- Surface area: 35.4 km^{2} (13.7 sq mi)
- Max. depth: 20.5 m (67 ft)
- Surface elevation: 19 m (62 ft)
- Islands: No islands, but the surface is dotted with oil rigs

Lac de Biscarrosse et de Parentis is a lake in Landes, France. At an elevation of 19 m, its surface area is 35.4 km^{2}.
