= Bouillé-Courdault =

- Commune
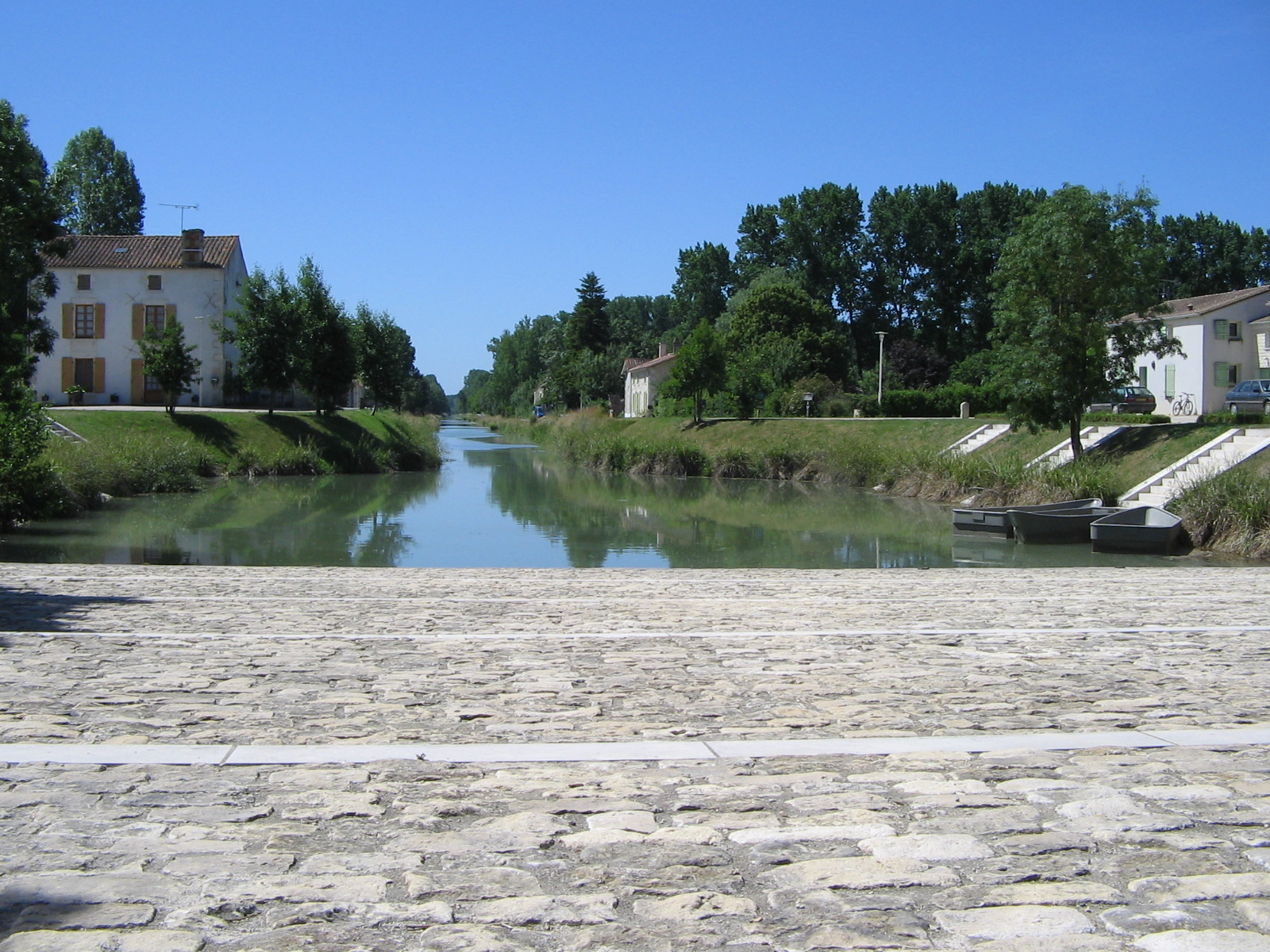
- The Courdault canal marina
- Location of Bouillé-Courdault
- Location within France Location within Pays de la Loire
- Coordinates: 46°23′29″N 0°41′16″W
- Country: France
- Region: Pays de la Loire
- Department: Vendée
- Arrondissement: Fontenay-le-Comte
- Canton: Fontenay-le-Comte
- Intercommunality: Vendée Sèvre Autise

Government
  - Mayor (2020–2026): Stéphane Guillon
- Area^{1}: 9.73 km^{2} (3.76 sq mi)
- Highest elevation: 22 m (72 ft)
- Lowest elevation: 2 m (6.6 ft)
- Population (2023): 595
  - Density: 61.2/km^{2} (158/sq mi)
- Time zone: UTC+01:00 (CET)
  - Summer (DST): UTC+02:00 (CEST)
- INSEE/Postal code: 85028 /85420
- ^{1} French Land Register data, which excludes lakes, ponds, glaciers > 1 km^{2} (0.386 sq mi or 247 acres) and river estuaries.

Bouillé-Courdault (French pronunciation: [buje kuʁdo]) is a commune in the Vendée department in the Pays de la Loire region in western France.

== See also ==
- Communes of the Vendée department
