= Damvix =

- Commune
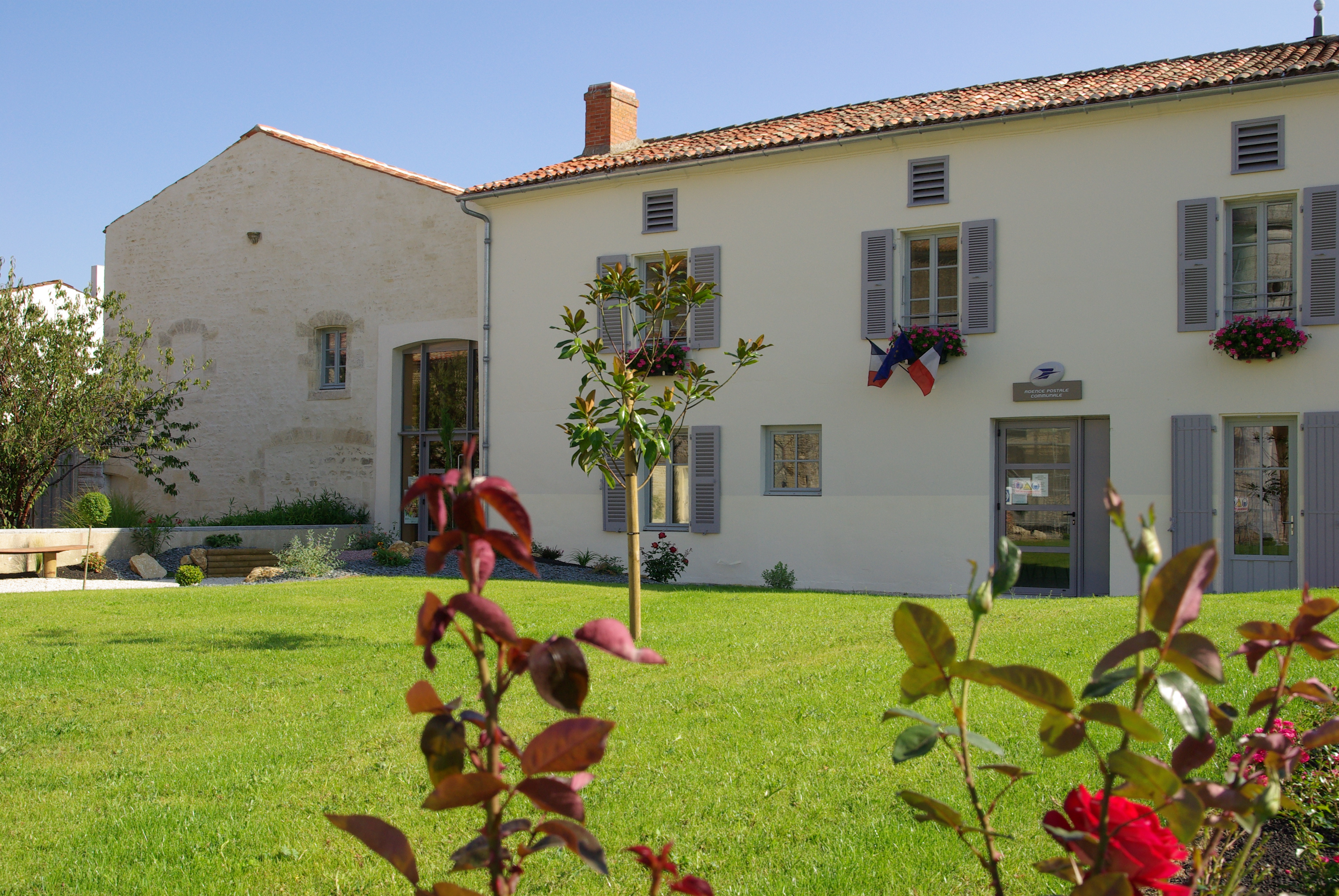
- Town hall

- Coat of arms
- Location of Damvix
- Location within France Location within Pays de la Loire
- Coordinates: 46°18′55″N 0°44′01″W
- Country: France
- Region: Pays de la Loire
- Department: Vendée
- Arrondissement: Fontenay-le-Comte
- Canton: Fontenay-le-Comte
- Intercommunality: Vendée Sèvre Autise

Government
  - Mayor (2020–2026): Gilles Bouteiller
- Area^{1}: 11.66 km^{2} (4.50 sq mi)
- Highest elevation: 10 m (33 ft)
- Lowest elevation: 0 m (0 ft)
- Population (2023): 733
  - Density: 62.9/km^{2} (163/sq mi)
- Time zone: UTC+01:00 (CET)
  - Summer (DST): UTC+02:00 (CEST)
- INSEE/Postal code: 85078 /85420
- ^{1} French Land Register data, which excludes lakes, ponds, glaciers > 1 km^{2} (0.386 sq mi or 247 acres) and river estuaries.

Damvix (French pronunciation: [dɑ̃viks]) is a commune in the Vendée department in the Pays de la Loire region in western France.

== See also ==
- Communes of the Vendée department
