= Montigny-l'Allier =

- Commune
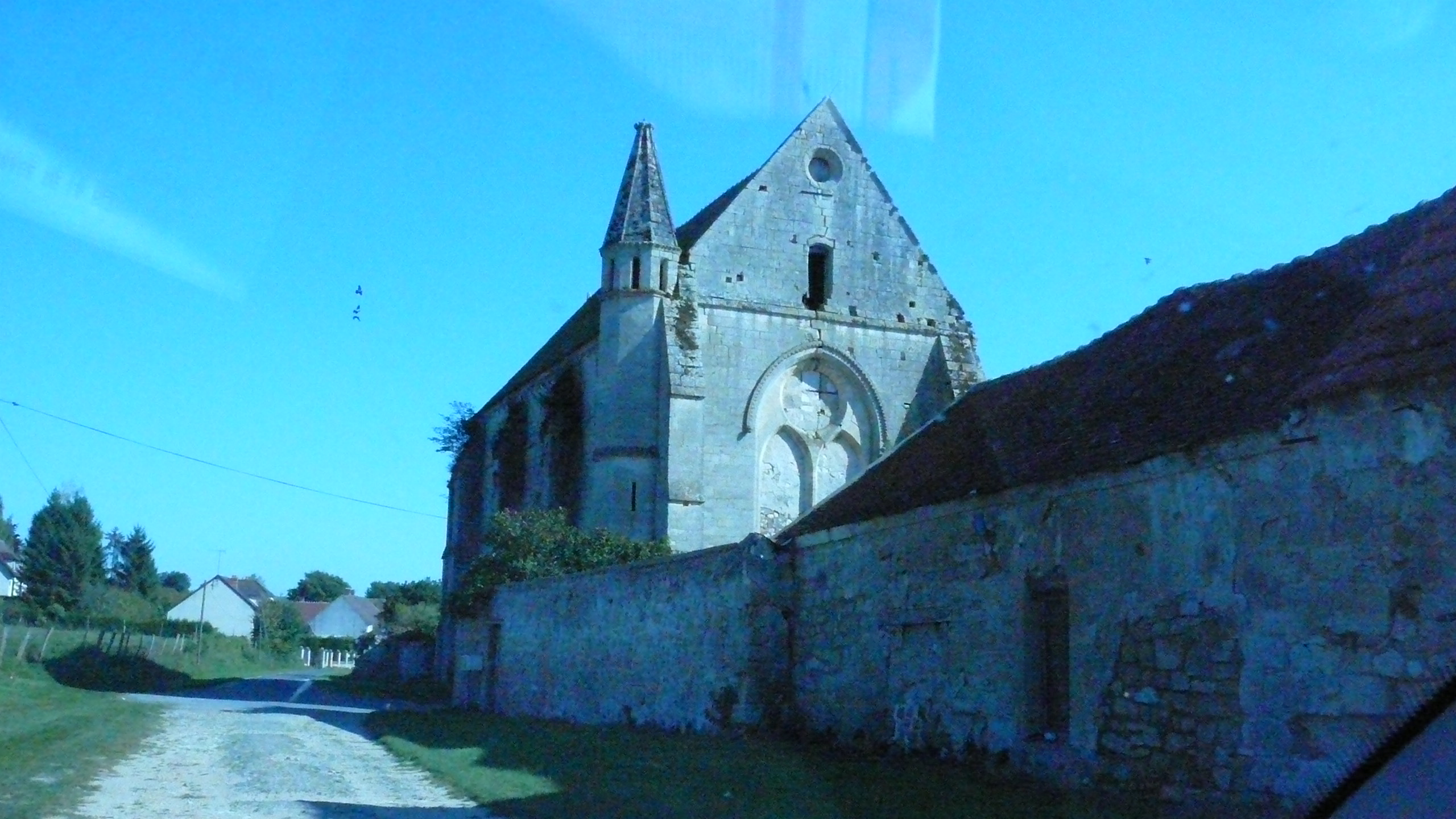
- Templar Commandery
- Location of Montigny-l'Allier
- Location within France Location within Hauts-de-France
- Coordinates: 49°06′44″N 3°06′14″E
- Country: France
- Region: Hauts-de-France
- Department: Aisne
- Arrondissement: Château-Thierry
- Canton: Villers-Cotterêts
- Intercommunality: CA Région de Château-Thierry

Government
  - Mayor (2026–32): Solange Rufin
- Area^{1}: 10.14 km^{2} (3.92 sq mi)
- Highest elevation: 151 m (495 ft)
- Lowest elevation: 55 m (180 ft)
- Population (2023): 273
  - Density: 26.9/km^{2} (69.7/sq mi)
- Time zone: UTC+01:00 (CET)
  - Summer (DST): UTC+02:00 (CEST)
- INSEE/Postal code: 02512 /02810
- ^{1} French Land Register data, which excludes lakes, ponds, glaciers > 1 km^{2} (0.386 sq mi or 247 acres) and river estuaries.

Montigny-l'Allier (French pronunciation: [mɔ̃tiɲi lalje]) is a commune in the Aisne department in Hauts-de-France in northern France.

== Population ==
Historical population
Year	Pop.	±% p.a.
1968	203	—
1975	178	−1.86%
1982	187	+0.71%
1990	202	+0.97%
1999	239	+1.89%
2007	268	+1.44%
2012	272	+0.30%
2017	274	+0.15%
2023	273	−0.06%
Source: INSEE

== See also ==
- Communes of the Aisne department
