= Neufchelles =

- Commune
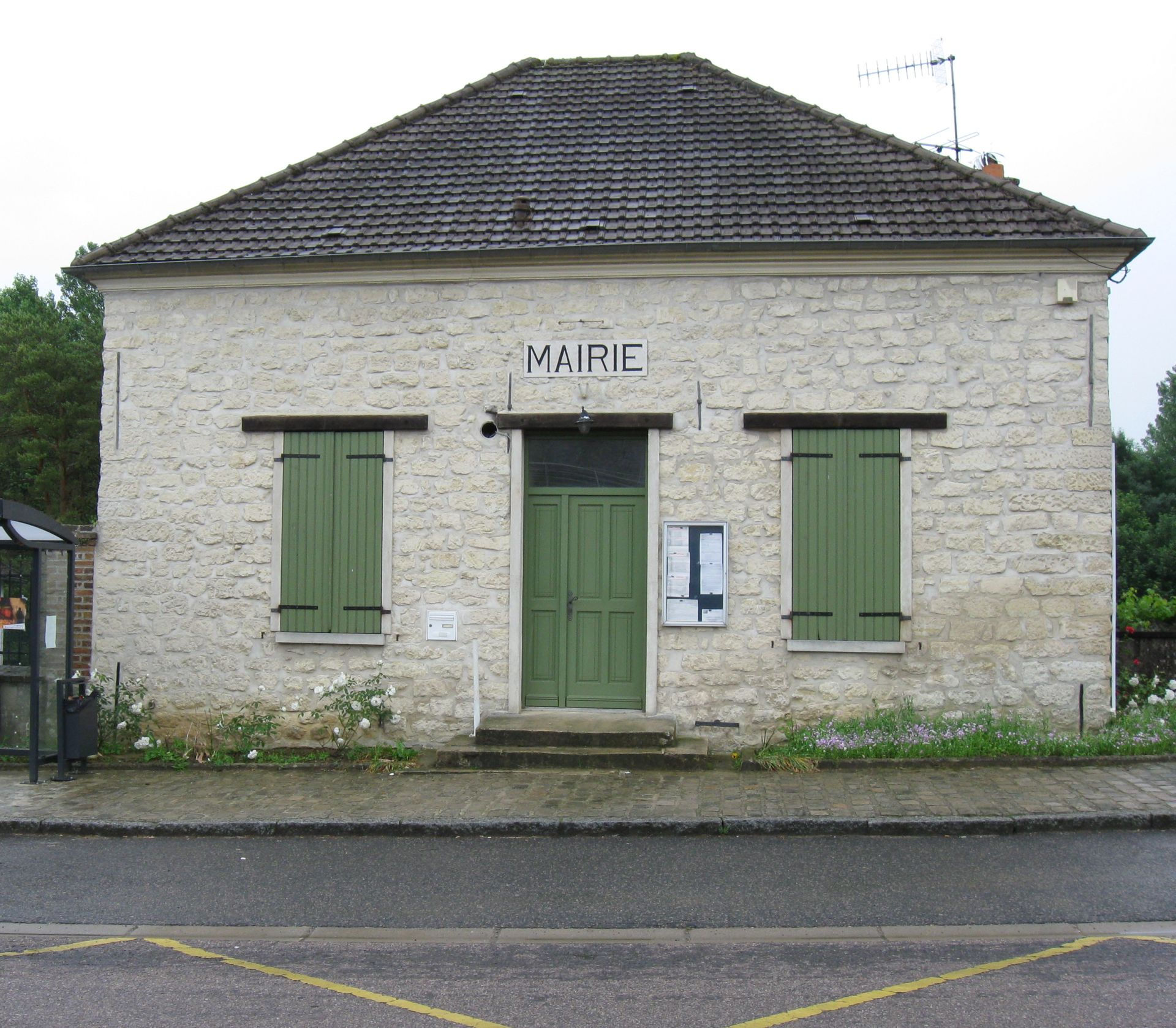
- The town hall in Neufchelles
- Location of Neufchelles
- Location within France Location within Hauts-de-France
- Coordinates: 49°07′02″N 3°03′45″E
- Country: France
- Region: Hauts-de-France
- Department: Oise
- Arrondissement: Senlis
- Canton: Nanteuil-le-Haudouin
- Intercommunality: Pays de Valois

Government
  - Mayor (2020–2026): François Lebrun
- Area^{1}: 6.46 km^{2} (2.49 sq mi)
- Elevation: 60 m (200 ft)
- Highest elevation: 153 m (502 ft)
- Lowest elevation: 55 m (180 ft)
- Population (2023): 386
  - Density: 59.8/km^{2} (155/sq mi)
- Time zone: UTC+01:00 (CET)
  - Summer (DST): UTC+02:00 (CEST)
- INSEE/Postal code: 60448 /60890
- ^{1} French Land Register data, which excludes lakes, ponds, glaciers > 1 km^{2} (0.386 sq mi or 247 acres) and river estuaries.

Neufchelles (French pronunciation: [nœfʃɛl]) is a commune in the Oise department in northern France. It is located 66 km north east of Paris and 40 km south east of Senlis.

== See also ==
- Communes of the Oise department
