= Seudre =

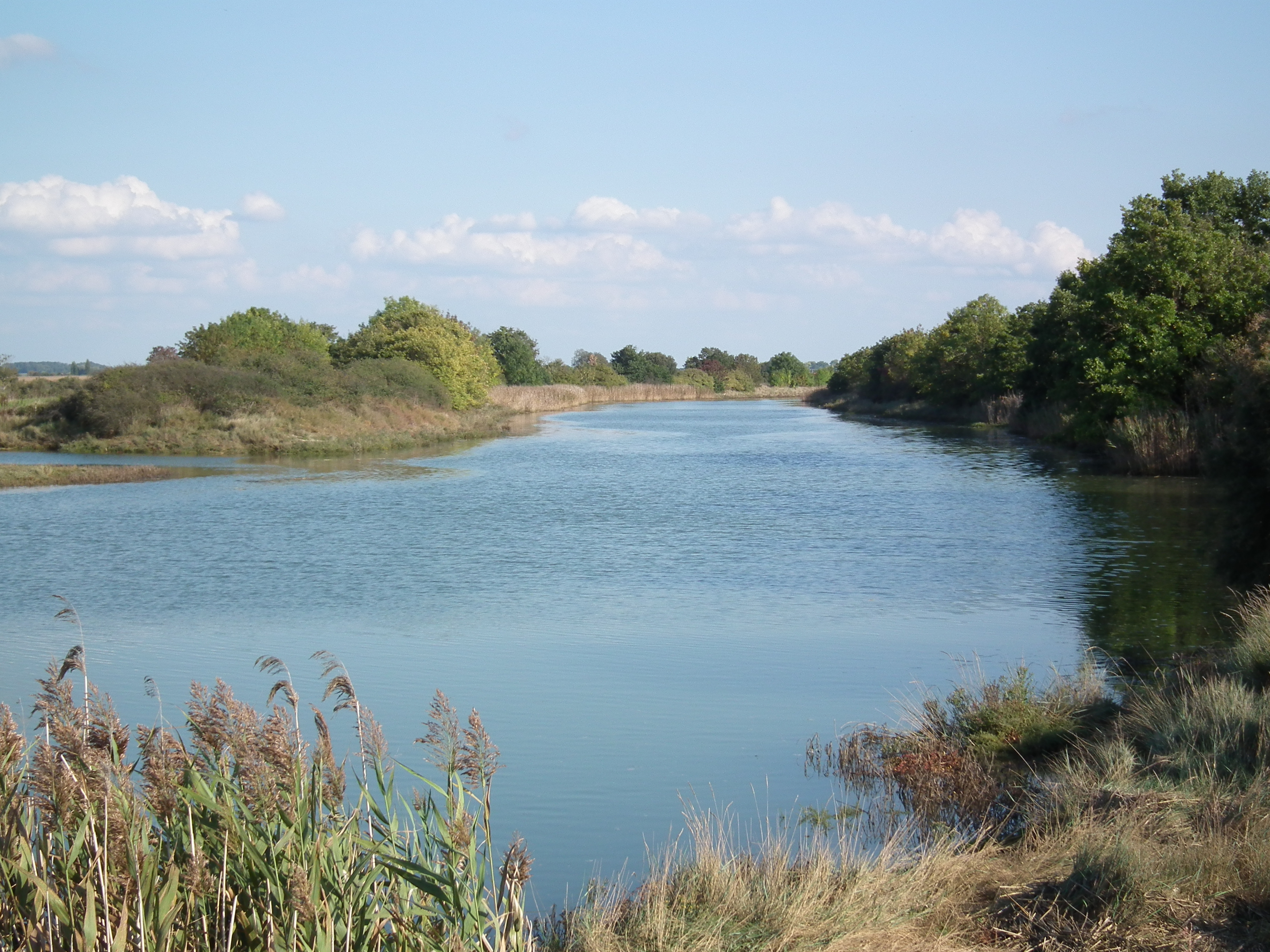
- The Seudre near Saujon

- Native name: La Seudre (French)

Location
- Country: France

Physical characteristics
- Source
  - location: Charente-Maritime
- Mouth
  - location: Atlantic Ocean
  - coordinates: 45°48′5″N 1°8′33″W
- Length: 68 km (42 mi)

The Seudre (French pronunciation: [sødʁ]) is a river in the Charente-Maritime département, southwestern France, flowing into the Atlantic Ocean. It is 68.2 km (42.4 mi) long. Its source is near Saint-Genis-de-Saintonge. It flows northwest through Saint-André-de-Lidon, Saujon and La Tremblade. It flows into the Atlantic Ocean near Marennes. The lower course of the Seudre is brackish, and is used for oyster farming.
