= Sèvre Niortaise =

River in France

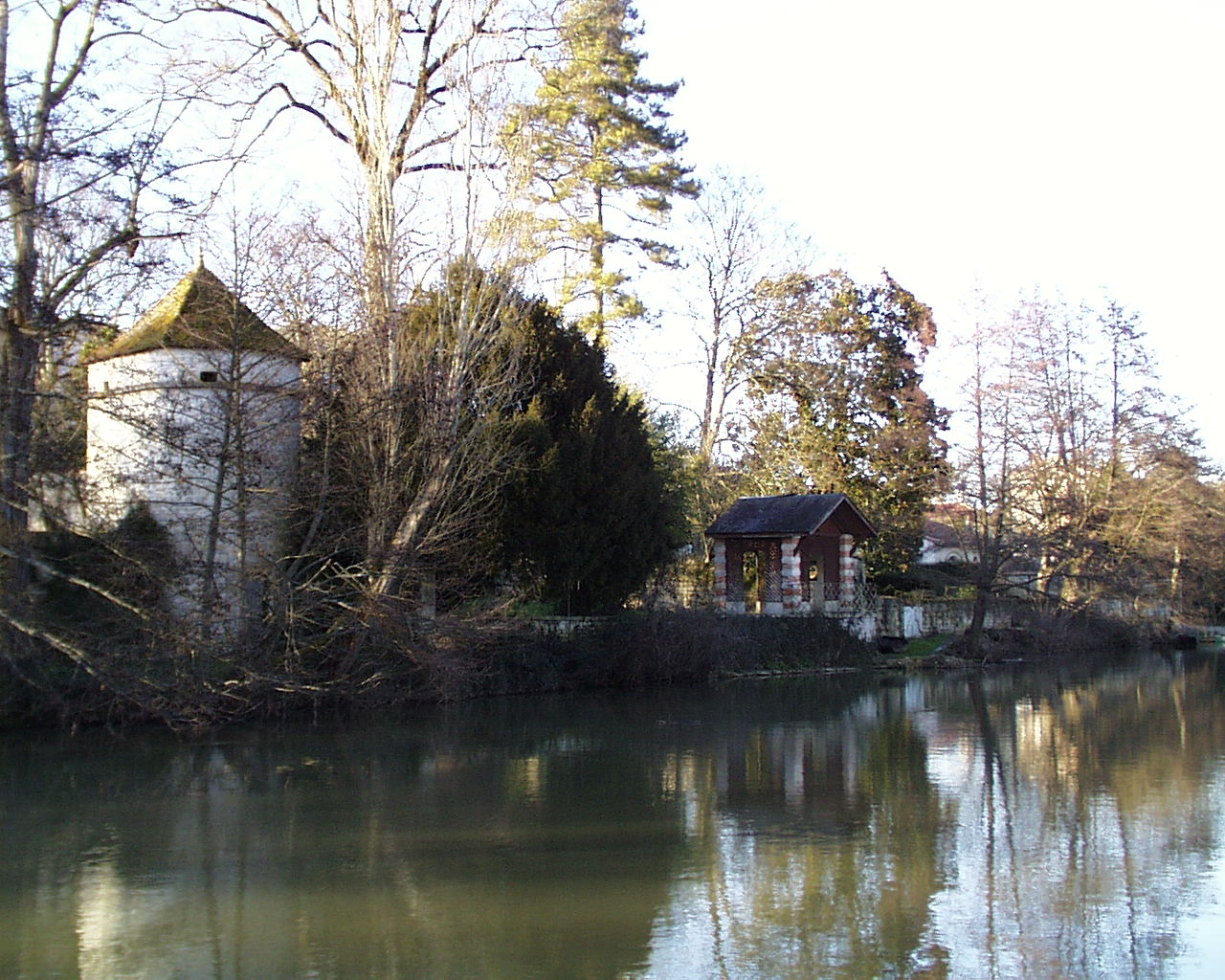
- The Sèvre Niortaise near Niort

- Native name: La Sèvre niortaise (French)

Location
- Country: France

Physical characteristics
- Source
  - location: Deux-Sèvres
  - elevation: 150 m (490 ft)
- Mouth
  - location: Atlantic Ocean
  - coordinates: 46°18′35″N 1°7′45″W
- Length: 158.4 km (98.4 mi)
- Discharge
  - average: 44 m^{3}/s (1,600 cu ft/s)

The Sèvre Niortaise (French pronunciation: [sɛvʁ njɔʁtɛz]) is a 158.4 km (98.4 mi) long river in the Nouvelle-Aquitaine and Pays de la Loire regions in western France, flowing into the Atlantic Ocean. Its source is in the Deux-Sèvres department, near Sepvret, north of Melle.

It flows through the following departments and towns:

- Deux-Sèvres: Saint-Maixent-l'École, Niort
- Vendée: Damvix
- Charente-Maritime: Marans

It flows into the Atlantic Ocean in Bourg-Chapon, north of the city of La Rochelle. The largest city along the river is Niort, which gives it the name Sèvre Niortaise, distinguishing it from the Sèvre Nantaise. Its largest tributaries are the Vendée and the Autise.
