= Deaths in December 2009 =

The following is a list of notable deaths in December 2009.

Entries for each day are listed alphabetically by surname. A typical entry lists information in the following sequence:

- Name, age, country of citizenship at birth, subsequent country of citizenship (if applicable), reason for notability, cause of death (if known), and reference.

== December 2009 ==
=== 1 ===
- Christoph Budde, 46, German football player (Borussia Mönchengladbach), swine flu.
- Maurice Clemmons, 37, American felon, perpetrator of the 2009 shooting of Lakewood, Washington, police officers, shot.
- Neil Dougall, 88, British footballer (Plymouth Argyle).
- Tommy Henrich, 96, American baseball player (New York Yankees).
- Bilal Omer Khan, 55, Pakistani general, victim of December 2009 Rawalpindi terrorist attack
- Nat Kipner, 85, American songwriter and record producer.
- Bill Lister, 86, American honky tonk singer.
- Alberto Martínez, 59, Uruguayan football player (FK Austria Wien), heart failure.
- Cordelia Oliver, 86, Scottish painter, journalist and art critic.
- Ramses Shaffy, 76, Dutch singer and actor, esophageal cancer.
- Shilendra Kumar Singh, 77, Indian politician, Governor of Rajasthan (2007–2009).
- Éva Szörényi, 92, Hungarian actress, Kossuth Prize winner.
- Donald Washington Sr., 79, American jazz tenor saxophonist, lung cancer.

=== 2 ===
- Harold A. Ackerman, 81, American federal judge, natural causes.
- Luis María Bandrés, 65, Spanish leader of Basque Nationalist Party.
- Elizabeth Berridge, 89, British novelist.
- Foge Fazio, 71, American football coach, leukemia.
- Shoji Hashimoto, 75, Japanese go master, myocardial infarction.
- Ikuo Hirayama, 79, Japanese painter, stroke.
- Maggie Jones, 75, British actress (Coronation Street).
- Jozo Križanović, 65, Bosnian politician, Croat member of the Presidency (2001–2002), complications from surgery.
- Brian Morrison, 76, Australian priest and humanitarian.
- Luís Lombardi Neto, 69, Brazilian announcer (Silvio Santos television program), stroke.
- Aaron Schroeder, 83, American songwriter, Alzheimer's disease.
- Ian Thompson, 74, Australian politician, member of the Western Australian Legislative Assembly (1971–1993).
- Vjekoslav Šutej, 58, Croatian conductor, leukemia.
- Eric Woolfson, 64, Scottish singer and keyboardist (The Alan Parsons Project), cancer.

=== 3 ===
- Ibrahim Hassan Addou, Somali Higher Education Minister, bombing.
- Qamar Aden Ali, 52, Somali Health Minister, bombing.
- Swadesh Bose, 81, Bangladeshi economist.
- Nat Boxer, 84, American sound engineer (Apocalypse Now, The Godfather Part II, The Conversation), Oscar winner (1980).
- Estêvão Cardoso de Avellar, 92, Brazilian Roman Catholic Bishop of Uberlândia (1978–1992).
- Paula Hawkins, 82, American politician, Senator from Florida (1981–1987), complications from a fall.
- István Iglódi, 65, Hungarian actor.
- Leila Lopes, 50, Brazilian actress, suicide by poisoning.
- Bert Main, 90, Australian zoologist.
- Brian Mason, 92, New Zealand scientist, renal failure.
- Curtis Nkondo, 81, South African politician, activist and diplomat.
- Pat Power, 67, Australian politician, member of the Victorian Legislative Council for Jika Jika (1992–1999).
- Sam Salt, 69, British rear admiral, captain of HMS Sheffield during the Falklands War.
- Peter Scanlon, 78, American accountant and chairman (Coopers & Lybrand), cancer.
- Åsmund L. Strømnes, 82, Norwegian educationalist.
- Valbjörn Þorláksson, 75, Icelandic decathlete.
- Richard Todd, 90, Irish-born British Academy Award-nominated actor (The Hasty Heart, The Dam Busters), (The Longest Day), cancer.
- Ahmed Abdulahi Waayeel, Somali Education Minister, bombing.
- Bobby Wayne Woods, 44, American convicted rapist, kidnapper and murderer, execution by lethal injection.
- Torrie Zito, 76, American pianist and arranger, emphysema.

=== 4 ===
- Richard T. Antoun, 77, American anthropologist and professor, stabbed.
- Harold Bell, 90, American marketer, licensing agent and technical advisor, creator of Woodsy Owl.
- Liam Clancy, 74, Irish folk singer (The Clancy Brothers), pulmonary fibrosis.
- Marjorie Kowalski Cole, 56, American writer.
- Tim Costello, 64, American labor and anti-globalization advocate, pancreatic cancer.
- Matthew Luo Duxi, 90, Chinese Roman Catholic Bishop of Jiading.
- Jérôme-Michel-Francis Martin, 68, French Roman Catholic Bishop of Berbérati (1987–1991).
- Bryan O'Byrne, 78, American character actor.
- Vyacheslav Tikhonov, 81, Russian actor (Seventeen Moments of Spring).
- Stephen Toulmin, 87, British philosopher and author, heart failure.
- Spyridon Trantellis, 83, Greek Metropolitan Bishop of Lagkadas, after long illness.
- Jordi Solé Tura, 79, Spanish politician and lawyer, co-author of Spanish Constitution and Minister of Culture (1991–1993).
- Umaga, 36, American professional wrestler (WWE), prescription drug overdose.
- Mall Vaasma, 64, Estonian mycologist.
- Mary Curtis Verna, 88, American operatic soprano (Metropolitan Opera), complications from a broken hip.
- Francis Wilford-Smith, 82, British cartoonist.

=== 5 ===
- Barrel Man, 69, American fan of the Denver Broncos, lung failure.
- Jerry Birn, 86, American television writer (The Young and the Restless).
- Nina Fishman, 63, British historian and political activist, cancer.
- Alfred Hrdlicka, 81, Austrian architect and draughtsman.
- Otto Graf Lambsdorff, 82, German politician, Minister of Economics (1977–1982; 1982–1984).
- William Lederer, 97, American author (The Ugly American), respiratory failure.
- Kálmán Markovits, 78, Hungarian Olympic gold (1952, 1956) and bronze (1960) medalist in water polo.
- Garfield Morgan, 78, British actor (The Sweeney), cancer.
- Malcolm Perry, 80, American attending physician to President John F. Kennedy after his assassination, lung cancer.
- Manuel Prado y Colón de Carvajal, 78, Spanish diplomat.
- Dumitru Puntea, 66, Moldovan politician.
- Jim Rohn, 79, American entrepreneur, author and motivational speaker, pulmonary fibrosis.
- Jack Rose, 38, American guitarist, heart attack.
- Princess Vimolchatra of Thailand, 88, Thai royal, cousin of King Bhumibol Adulyadej, renal failure.
- William A. Wilson, 95, American Ambassador to the Holy See (1984–1986).

=== 6 ===
- Dennis P. Collins, 85, American politician, mayor of Bayonne, New Jersey (1974–1990).
- Rupprecht Geiger, 101, German painter.
- Garland Lewis, 97, American basketball player.
- Dermott Monteith, 66, Irish cricketer.
- John Pittenger, 79, American politician, Pennsylvania Secretary of Education (1972–1976), Parkinson's disease.
- Bina Rai, 78, Indian actress (Anarkali), heart attack.
- Daouda Sow, 76, Senegalese politician, President of National Assembly (1984–1998).

=== 7 ===
- Frank M. Coffin, 90, American politician, Representative from Maine (1957–1961), complications of aortic aneurysm surgery.
- Royden G. Derrick, 94, American general authority of the LDS Church, natural causes.
- Al Dorow, 80, American football player (Washington Redskins, New York Titans), bone cancer.
- Shunkichi Hamada, 99, Japanese Olympic silver medal-winning (1932) field hockey player.
- Lorenzo Ochoa Salas, Mexican archeologist.
- Grady Patterson, 85, American politician, South Carolina state Treasurer (1966–1995; 1999–2007), natural causes.
- Carlene Hatcher Polite, 77, American novelist, cancer.
- Mark Ritts, 63, American actor and puppeteer (Beakman's World), kidney cancer.
- Ray Solomonoff, 83, American physicist and artificial intelligence pioneer.
- Pyotr Vail, 60, Russian essayist and journalist.

=== 8 ===
- James Bingham, 84, British artist.
- Kenneth Biros, 51, American convicted murderer, execution by lethal injection.
- Joan Bridge, 97, British costume designer (A Man for All Seasons, Julia, Fiddler on the Roof), Oscar winner (1967).
- Su Cruickshank, 63, Australian jazz singer and actress (Young Einstein), heart and kidney failure.
- Luis Días, 57, Dominican musician and songwriter, heart attack.
- Dean Fasano, 54, American vocalist (Prophet, Message), coronary artery disease.
- John Givens, 83, American basketball coach (Kentucky Colonels, 1967).
- Arthur Glasser, 95, American missionary and theologian.
- Robert Hill, Jamaican entertainer, shot.
- Karel Klančnik, 92, Yugoslavian Olympic ski jumper.
- Elza Medeiros, 88, Brazilian nurse, World War II veteran.
- William C. McInnes, 86, American Jesuit, president of Fairfield University (1964–1973); USF (1973–1976).
- Anthony Sanusi, 98, Nigerian Roman Catholic Bishop of Ijebu-Ode (1969–1990).
- Fred Sheffield, 86, American basketball player.
- Sir Philip Watson, 90, British admiral.

=== 9 ===
- Luiz Carlos Alborghetti, 64, Brazilian television presenter and politician, lung cancer.
- Gene Barry, 90, American actor (The War of the Worlds, Burke's Law, Bat Masterson), heart failure.
- Robert J. Carney, 76, Canadian educator and father of Mark Carney.
- Roger Jacobi, 62, British archaeologist.
- Sa'ad Khair, 56, Jordanian secret service chief, heart attack.
- Piotr Krzywicki, 45, Polish politician, pancreatic cancer.
- Kjell Eugenio Laugerud García, 79, Guatemalan President (1974–1978), complications from cancer.
- Rodrigo Carazo Odio, 82, Costa Rican politician, President (1978–1982), heart failure.
- Faramarz Payvar, 76, Iranian composer and santur player, brain damage.
- Onofre Cândido Rosa, 85, Brazilian Roman Catholic Bishop of Jardim (1981–1999).
- Goldie Semple, 56, Canadian stage actor, breast cancer.
- Norman Sykes, 73, English footballer (Bristol Rovers).

=== 10 ===
- Apolonia Muñoz Abarca, 89, American activist.
- Gene Carpenter, 70, American football coach.
- Dilip Chitre, 70, Indian poet, cancer.
- Kenny Dino, 70, American pop singer.
- Val Eastwood, 82, Australian businessperson.
- Jean-Robert Gauthier, 80, Canadian MP for Ottawa East (1972–1974), Ottawa—Vanier (1974–1994); Senator (1994–2004), stroke.
- Sir John Gingell, 84, British Air Chief Marshal and Black Rod (1985–1992).
- Thomas Hoving, 78, American director of the Metropolitan Museum of Art (1967–1977), lung cancer.
- Sir Alan Huggins, 88, British jurist, vice-president of the Court of Appeal of Hong Kong (1980–1987).
- Colin James, 83, British Anglican prelate, Bishop of Winchester (1985–1995), chest infection.
- József Kóczián, 83, Hungarian table tennis player.
- William L. Reilly, 94, American Jesuit and philosophy professor, President of Le Moyne College (1964–1976).

=== 11 ===
- Brindley Benn, 86, Guyanese politician, Deputy Prime Minister, natural causes.
- Ernest E. Chabot, 87, American politician.
- Francisco Piquer, 87, Spanish actor.
- Ciarán Mac Mathúna, 84, Irish radio presenter and music collector.
- Eric Wrinkles, 49, American convicted murderer, execution by lethal injection.

=== 12 ===
- Val Avery, 85, American actor (The Killing of a Chinese Bookie).
- Klavdiya Boyarskikh, 70, Russian cross-country skier, Olympic gold medalist (1964).
- Charles Copland, 99, British Anglican priest, Dean of Argyll and The Isles (1977–1979).
- Charles Davis, 84, American actor, heart attack.
- Ali Gharbi, 54, Tunisian swimmer.
- Howard Wesley Johnson, 87, American educator, president of MIT (1966–1971).
- Napoleon A. Jones Jr., 69, American federal judge.
- Manuel Ruiz Sosa, 72, Spanish footballer and coach.
- Eugene van Tamelen, 84, American chemist, cancer.

=== 13 ===
- Dan Barton, 88, American actor, heart failure and kidney disease.
- Julian Fane, 82, British author.
- Moyra Fraser, 86, Australian-born British actress (As Time Goes By).
- Yvonne King, 89, American singer (The King Sisters).
- Börje Langefors, 94, Swedish engineer and computer scientist.
- Arne Næss, 84, Norwegian politician, Mayor of Bergen.
- Piergiorgio Nesti, 78, Italian Roman Catholic archbishop of Camerino-San Severino Marche.
- Paul Samuelson, 94, American economist, Nobel Prize winner (1970).
- Sha'ari Tadin, 77, Singaporean educator and public servant, Parkinson's disease.
- Thomas F. Stroock, 84, American politician, Ambassador to Guatemala (1989–1992).
- Larry Sultan, 63, American photographer, cancer.
- Wilton, 62, Brazilian footballer.

=== 14 ===
- Alan A'Court, 75, English footballer (Liverpool, England), cancer.
- Jack Denham, 85, Australian horse trainer, winner of 1997 Caulfield and Melbourne Cup (Might and Power).
- Chris Feinstein, 42, American bassist (The Cardinals).
- Stocker Fontelieu, 86, American actor and executive director (New Orleans theatre), complications from a fall.
- Conard Fowkes, 76, American actor (Dark Shadows).
- Erma Henderson, 92, American politician and civil rights activist, president of the Detroit City Council (1977–1989).
- Per Jensen, 79, Danish soccer player.
- Miodrag Jovanović, 87, Serbian Olympic silver medal-winning (1948) footballer.
- George McKinnon, 91, American basketball and baseball coach.
- David Pecaut, 54, Canadian municipal entrepreneur, colorectal cancer.
- Daniel Piscopo, 89, Maltese politician.
- Sol Price, 93, American businessman, founder of Price Club, natural causes.

=== 15 ===
- Curtis Allina, 87, American businessman, executive of Pez Candy (1955–1979), heart failure.
- C. D. B. Bryan, 73, American author, cancer.
- Sir Chris Clarke, 68, British politician, leader of Somerset County Council.
- Milena Müllerová, 86, Czech gymnast, Olympic champion (1948).
- Arnaldo Ribeiro, 79, Brazilian Roman Catholic archbishop of Ribeirão Preto (1988–2006).
- Oral Roberts, 91, American evangelist, founder of Oral Roberts University, complications from pneumonia.
- James Rossant, 81, American architect, designer of Reston, Virginia, leukemia.
- Herbert Spiegel, 95, American psychiatrist.

=== 16 ===
- Arturo Beltrán Leyva, 48, Mexican drug lord, shot.
- Arthur Cores, 52, American businessman, founder of Boston Market, esophageal cancer.
- Drexell R. Davis, 88, American politician, Kentucky Secretary of State and state treasurer.
- Roy E. Disney, 79, American entertainment executive (The Walt Disney Company), nephew of Walt Disney, stomach cancer.
- Karel Dufek, 93, Czechoslovak diplomat, Spanish Civil War veteran.
- Yegor Gaidar, 53, Russian politician, acting Prime Minister (1992), thrombus.
- Dennis Herod, 86, English footballer (Stoke City).
- Fred Honsberger, 58, American radio personality.
- T. G. H. James, 86, British egyptologist.
- Kelly Kwalik, 53-54, Indonesian West Papua separatist leader and commander (Free Papua Movement), shot.
- Dame Victoire Ridsdale, Lady Ridsdale, 88, British politician, World War II intelligence agent, inspiration for Miss Moneypenny.
- Manto Tshabalala-Msimang, 69, South African politician, Minister of Health (1999–2008), complications from a liver transplant.
- Vladimir Turchinsky, 46, Russian actor, bodybuilder and showman, heart attack.
- Josef Voß, 72, German Roman Catholic Auxiliary Bishop of Munster, Titular Bishop of Thisiduo (since 1988).
- Bob Waldmire, 64, American Route 66 artist, cancer.

=== 17 ===
- Amin al-Hafiz, 88, Syrian politician, President (1963–1966).
- P. R. Anthonis, 98, Sri Lankan surgeon.
- Alaina Reed Hall, 63, American actress (Sesame Street, 227), breast cancer.
- Chris Henry, 26, American football player (Cincinnati Bengals), blunt force trauma after fall from vehicle.
- Jennifer Jones, 90, American Academy Award-winning actress (The Song of Bernadette), natural causes.
- Michel Leblond, 77, French Olympic footballer.
- Abdullah Said al Libi, Libyan al-Qaeda member, drone strike.
- Miljenko Mihić, 75, Serbian football coach.
- Dan O'Bannon, 63, American screenwriter (Alien, Total Recall, Blue Thunder), Crohn's disease.
- Samuel Victor Perry, 91, British biochemist.
- Hans Pfenninger, 80, Swiss Olympic cyclist.
- Albert Ràfols-Casamada, 86, Spanish artist.

=== 18 ===
- Fred Bachrach, 95, Dutch art historian.
- Chas Balun, 61, American artist and journalist, cancer.
- José Bardina, 70, Spanish-Venezuelan actor, bladder cancer.
- Oskar Danon, 96, Bosnian conductor and composer.
- John Henry Fischer, 99, American educator, President of Teachers College, Columbia University (1962–1974), heart failure.
- Connie Hines, 78, American actress (Mister Ed), heart failure.
- John E. Jeuck, 93, American professor.
- Harold Lundrigan, 81, Canadian businessman.
- Archimandrite Joasaph, 47, American Head of the Russian Ecclesiastical Mission in Jerusalem of the ROCOR, cancer.
- László Nagy, 88, Hungarian-born Swiss Secretary General of the World Organization of the Scout Movement (1968–1988).
- Job Osacky, 63, American archbishop of the Orthodox Church in America.
- Georgina Parkinson, 71, English ballet dancer and ballet mistress, cancer.
- Mike Simpson, 47, American politician, Michigan state Representative (since 2006), heart attack.
- Adelbert St. John, 78, Canadian-born Austrian ice hockey player.
- Bob Willoughby, 82, American photographer, cancer.
- Robin Wood, 78, British film critic, leukemia.
- Rex Yetman, 76, Canadian bluegrass mandolin player
- Jack Zilly, 88, American football player (Los Angeles Rams).

=== 19 ===
- Charles Birch, 91, Australian geneticist.
- Tony Bukovich, 94, American ice hockey player (Detroit Red Wings).
- Margaret Christensen, 88, Australian actress.
- Edith Díaz, 70, Puerto Rican-born American actress, heart failure.
- Lincoln Gordon, 96, American diplomat and academic, Ambassador to Brazil (1961–1966), President of Johns Hopkins University (1967–1971).
- Grand Ayatollah Hussein-Ali Montazeri, 87, Iranian cleric and dissident, natural causes.
- Zeki Ökten, 68, Turkish film director, heart disease.
- Kim Peek, 58, American savant, inspiration for Rain Man, heart attack.
- Donald Pickering, 76, British actor (The Pallisers, A Bridge Too Far, The Man Who Knew Too Little).
- Roger Rawson, 70, American politician, former majority leader of the Utah House of Representatives, liver disease.
- Loren Singer, 86, American novelist (The Parallax View).

=== 20 ===
- Joan Brosnan Walsh, 71, Irish actress (Fair City), motor neurone disease.
- Jack Brownsword, 86, British footballer (Scunthorpe United).
- James Gurley, 69, American guitarist (Big Brother and the Holding Company), heart attack.
- Jack Hixon, 88, British football scout.
- Arun Krushnaji Kamble, 56, Indian Dalit activist, drowned. (body discovered on this date)
- Yiannis Moralis, 93, Greek visual artist.
- Brittany Murphy, 32, American actress (Clueless, King of the Hill, 8 Mile), pneumonia.
- Shari Rhodes, 71, American casting director (Jaws, Close Encounters of the Third Kind, Breaking Bad).
- Vera Rich, 73, British poet, journalist, historian, and translator.
- Lester Rodney, 98, American sports journalist.
- Arnold Stang, 91, American actor (Top Cat, It's a Mad, Mad, Mad, Mad World, The Man with the Golden Arm), pneumonia.
- Ira Trombley, 57, American politician, member of the Vermont House of Representatives (since 2002), natural causes.

=== 21 ===
- Suryakant Acharya, 80, Indian politician, natural causes.
- Jaime Agudelo, 84, Colombian comedian, respiratory failure.
- Craigie Aitchison, 83, British painter.
- Dick Archer, 82, Australian politician, member of the Tasmanian Legislative Council (1980–1992).
- Ann Nixon Cooper, 107, American civil rights activist, mentioned in President Obama's election victory speech.
- James Cowley, 90, British recipient of the Distinguished Conduct Medal.
- Kenneth Gustavsson, 63, Swedish photographer.
- Rick Hube, 62, American politician, member of the Vermont House of Representatives (since 1998).
- David Isaacs, 63, Jamaican singer (The Itals).
- Pete King, 80, British saxophonist, co-founder of Ronnie Scott's Jazz Club.
- Edwin G. Krebs, 91, American Nobel Prize-winning biochemist.
- Christos Lambrakis, 75, Greek businessman, publisher and journalist, multiple organ failure.
- Marianne Stone, 87, British character actress (Carry On).

=== 22 ===
- Al Bernardin, 81, American restaurateur, inventor of the Quarter Pounder, stroke.
- Gilbert de Chambrun, 100, French politician.
- Mick Cocks, 54, Australian guitarist (Rose Tattoo), liver cancer.
- Luis Francisco Cuéllar, 69, Colombian politician, Governor of Caqueta, assassination by cut throat.
- Michael Currie, 81, American actor (Dark Shadows, Sudden Impact).
- Bernhard Droog, 88, Dutch actor, pneumonia.
- Milena Dvorská, 71, Czech film actress.
- Edward Maitland-Makgill-Crichton, 93, British army general.
- Andy Manson, 73, Australian politician, member of the New South Wales Legislative Council (1995–2000).
- Duncan Paterson, 66, Scottish rugby union player and administrator.
- Sir Bob Phillis, 64, British media executive, cancer.
- Albert Scanlon, 74, English footballer (Manchester United), survivor of Munich air disaster.
- Piers Wardle, 49, British artist, brain haemorrhage.

=== 23 ===
- Lucas Abadamloora, 71, Ghanaian Roman Catholic Bishop of Navrongo-Bolgatanga (1994–2009).
- Lilo Allgayer, 94, German Olympic fencer.
- Ike Aronowicz, 86, Israeli captain of the SS Exodus.
- Grigory Baklanov, 86, Russian novelist.
- Charles Bullen, 90, American politician, Utah House of Representatives (1971–1977) and Senate (1977–1985).
- Izhar Haider, 65, Urdu poet.
- Robert L. Howard, 70, American soldier, Medal of Honor recipient (1971), pancreatic cancer.
- Micah Naftalin, 76, American advocate for Soviet Jews.
- Ngapoi Ngawang Jigme, 99, Chinese politician, Chairman of the Tibet Autonomous Region (1964–1968; 1981–1983).
- Peter O'Hagan, Irish politician.
- Edward Schillebeeckx, 95, Belgian theologian.
- Rainer Zepperitz, 79, Indonesian-born German double bassist.

=== 24 ===
- Marcus Bakker, 86, Dutch politician, party leader of the Communist Party of the Netherlands (1963–1982).
- Stan Benjamin, 95, American baseball player (Philadelphia Phillies) and scout (Houston Astros).
- Giulio Bosetti, 79, Italian actor and film director, cancer.
- Rafael Caldera, 93, Venezuelan politician, President (1969–1974; 1994–1999).
- George Cowling, 89, British weatherman.
- Victor Khain, 95, Russian geologist.
- Terry Lawless, 76, British boxing manager and trainer.
- Henry van Lieshout, 77, Dutch-born Papua New Guinean Roman Catholic Bishop of Lae (1966–2007).
- George Michael, 70, American sportscaster and disc jockey, chronic lymphocytic leukemia.
- Eysteinn Þórðarson, 75, Icelandic Olympic skier.Eysteinn Þórðarson
- Gero von Wilpert, 76, German literary scientist.
- Brian Young, 79, British naval officer.

=== 25 ===
- Christopher Bell, 35, American disability studies scholar.
- Bill Burich, 92, American baseball player (Philadelphia Phillies).
- Charlie Capps, 84, American politician, member of Mississippi House of Representatives (1972–2005).
- Vic Chesnutt, 45, American folk rock musician, muscle relaxant overdose.
- Rusty Dedrick, 91, American swing and bebop jazz trumpeter.
- Knut Haugland, 92, Norwegian explorer and World War II veteran, last surviving member of the Kon-Tiki expedition.
- Rick Kane, 55, American football player (Detroit Lions), pneumonia.
- A. Robert Kaufman, 78, American socialist, kidney failure.
- Morris E. Lasker, 92, American federal judge, cancer.
- Rachel Wetzsteon, 42, American poet, suicide.

=== 26 ===
- Charles F. Baird, 87, American politician.
- Dennis Brutus, 85, South African poet and anti-Apartheid activist, prostate cancer.
- Giuseppe Chiappella, 85, Italian football player and manager.
- Odd Kirkeby, 84, Norwegian politician.
- Peder Lunde Sr., 91, Norwegian Olympic silver medal-winning (1952) sailor.
- Arthur McIntyre, 91, British cricketer.
- Yves Rocher, 79, French entrepreneur and mayor of La Gacilly, founder of Yves Rocher Cosmetics.
- Ihor Ševčenko, 87, Polish philologist.
- Percy Sutton, 89, American civil rights activist, politician and attorney, Manhattan Borough President (1966–1977).
- Jacques Sylla, 63, Malagasy politician, Prime Minister of Madagascar (2002–2007).
- David Taylor, 63, British politician, MP for North West Leicestershire (since 1997), heart attack.
- Norval White, 83, American author (AIA Guide to New York City), heart attack.
- Felix Wurman, 51, American cellist, cancer.

=== 27 ===
- Maryam Babangida, 61, Nigerian First Lady, wife of former President Ibrahim Babangida, ovarian cancer.
- Gunnar Kemnitz, 82, Brazilian Olympic diver.
- Terry L. Punt, 60, American politician, Pennsylvania State Senator (1989–2009) and State Representative (1979–1988).
- Narra Venkateswara Rao, 62, Indian actor, cancer.
- Isaac Schwartz, 86, Russian composer (White Sun of the Desert).
- Takashi Takabayashi, 78, Japanese footballer.

=== 28 ===
- Allen Batsford, 77, British football manager (Wimbledon), heart attack.
- Habib Bourguiba Jr., 82, Tunisian diplomat and politician, Minister of Foreign Affairs (1964–1970).
- D. F. Cartwright, 93, British businessman.
- Sir Jack Harman, 89, British general.
- Zoltán Horváth, 30, Romanian-born Hungarian basketball player, traffic collision.
- Terry Matte, 66, Canadian television news producer, cancer.
- Manfred R. Schroeder, 83, German physicist.
- J. David Singer, 84, American political scientist.
- Witold Skulicz, 83, Polish artist.
- The Rev, 28, American hard rock and heavy metal drummer (Avenged Sevenfold), drug overdose.

=== 29 ===
- Roberto Amadei, 76, Italian Roman Catholic monsignor, bishop of Bergamo (1991–2009).
- C. Ashwath, 71, Indian Kannada singer, liver and renal failure.
- Carlo Cerioni, 84, Italian Olympic basketball player.
- Chemogoh Kevin Dzang, 68, Ghanaian soldier.
- David Levine, 83, American caricaturist (The New York Review of Books), prostate cancer.
- Paul Sapsford, 60, New Zealand rugby union player (Otago, national team), injuries sustained in a jetboat accident.
- Akmal Shaikh, 53, Pakistani-born British drug trafficker, executed by lethal injection.
- M. S. Sivasankariah, 82, Indian cricket umpire.
- Robert H. Smith, 81, American real estate developer and philanthropist, creator of Crystal City, Virginia, stroke.
- Steve Williams, 49, American professional wrestler, throat cancer.

=== 30 ===
- Anthony Alaimo, 89, American federal judge (Southern District of Georgia).
- Bessie Blount Griffin, 95, American inventor and forensic scientist.
- Peter Corren, 62, Canadian gay rights activist, cancer.
- Adrian Kivumbi Ddungu, 86, Ugandan Roman Catholic Bishop of Masaka.
- Maldwyn Evans, 72, Welsh bowler, world champion (1972).
- Rowland S. Howard, 50, Australian musician and songwriter (The Birthday Party), liver cancer.
- Michelle Lang, 34, Canadian reporter (Calgary Herald), IED explosion.
- Ruth Lilly, 94, American philanthropist (Eli Lilly and Company), heart failure.
- Alberto Lysy, 74, Argentine violinist and composer.
- Jennifer Matthews, 45, American CIA officer, suicide bombing.
- Gloria Nord, 87, American skater.
- Walter Pérez, 85, Uruguayan Olympic sprinter.
- Vasily Shandybin, 68, Russian politician.
- Peter Shirayanagi, 81, Japanese Cardinal of the Roman Catholic Church.
- Jacquie Sturm, 82, New Zealand writer and poet.
- Vishnuvardhan, 59, Indian Kannada actor, cardiac arrest.
- Abdurrahman Wahid, 69, Indonesian politician, President (1999–2001), heart failure.
- Norman Walker, 74, Australian rules footballer.
- Perry Wilson, 93, American actress (Fear Strikes Out).
- Jeremy Wise, 35, American CIA contractor, terrorist attack.
- Leon Yao Liang, 86, Chinese bishop.
- Ivan Zulueta, 66, Spanish designer and film director.

=== 31 ===
- Arthur E. Bartlett, 76, American realtor, co-founder of Century 21, Alzheimer's disease.
- Umalat Magomedov, 30, leader of the Vilayat Dagestan, terrorist, killed by Russian troops.
- Tod Campeau, 86, Canadian ice hockey player.
- Giulio Corsini, 76, Italian football player and manager.
- John Cushnie, 66, Irish gardening expert and radio presenter, heart attack.
- Cahal Daly, 92, Irish Cardinal of the Roman Catholic church, Primate of All Ireland (1990–1996).
- Maurice Dupras, 86, Canadian politician.
- Ann Linnea Sandberg, 71, American immunologist.
- George M. Holmes, 80, American politician, member of the North Carolina General Assembly (1975–1977, 1979–2009).
- Ross Johnstone, 83, Canadian ice hockey player.
- Rashidi Kawawa, 83, Tanzanian politician, Prime Minister of Tanganyika (1962) and Tanzania (1972–1977).
- Justin Keating, 79, Irish humanist and Labour Party politician (Minister for Industry and Commerce, 1973–1977).
- Helen Lewis, 93, Czech-born British dancer and concentration camp survivor.
- Guido Lorraine, 97, Polish-born British actor.
- William May, 56, American-born Australian artistic director (Walking with Dinosaurs – The Live Experience), pneumonia.
- Glauco Onorato, 73, Italian actor and voice actor.
- Bill Powell, 93, American golf course designer, stroke.
- Qian Xinzhong, 98, Chinese politician, Minister of Health (1965–1973, 1979–1983).
- Youssef Ibrahim Sarraf, 69, Egyptian Chaldean Bishop of Cairo (since 1984).
- Frans Seda, 83, Indonesian economist, Minister of Finance (1966–1968).
- William Tuohy, 83, American journalist and Pulitzer Prize-winning foreign correspondent, complications from heart surgery.
- Mikhail Vartanov, 72, Russian actor.
