= Aff (river) =

River in western France

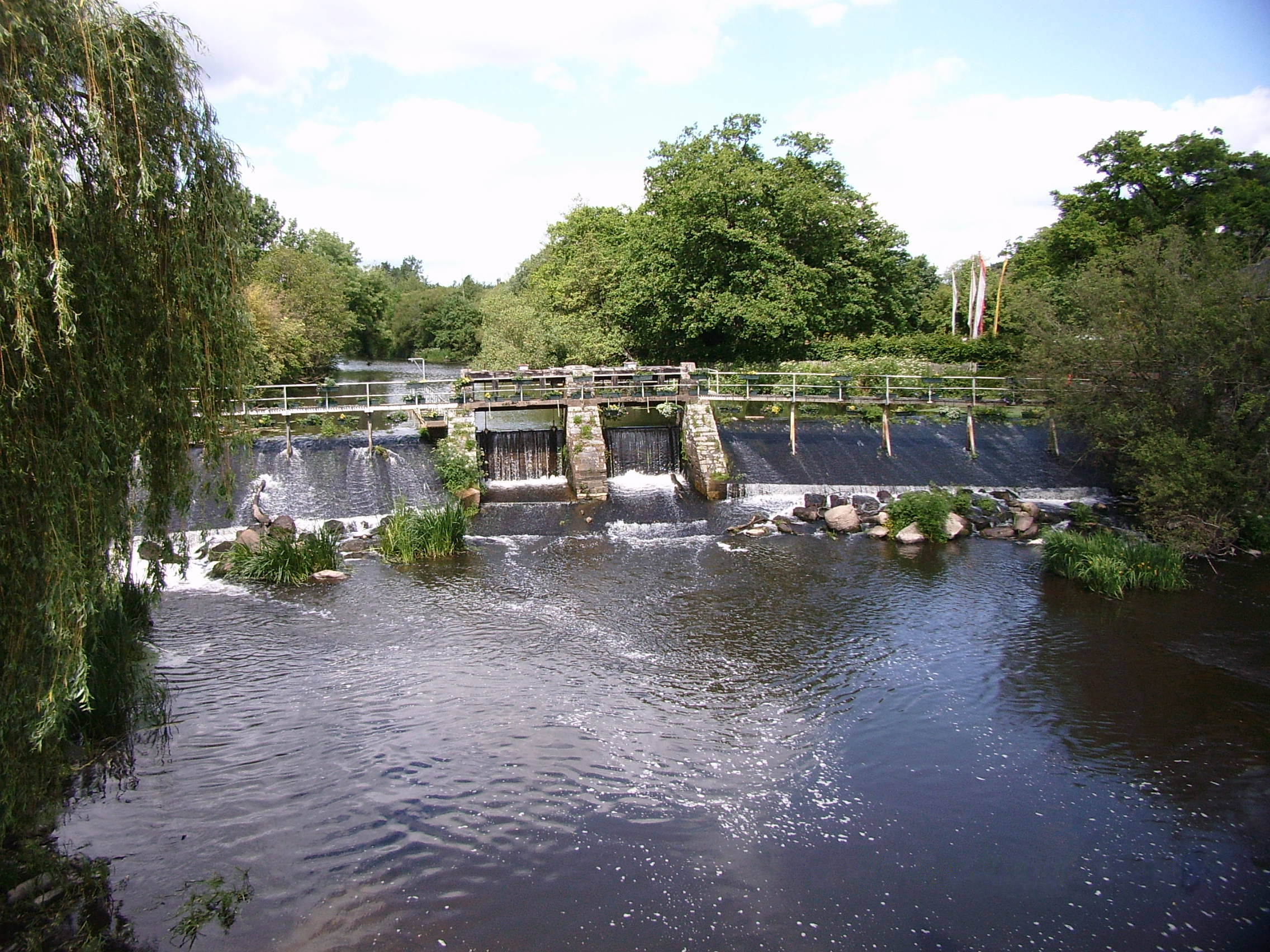
- The Aff at La Gacilly

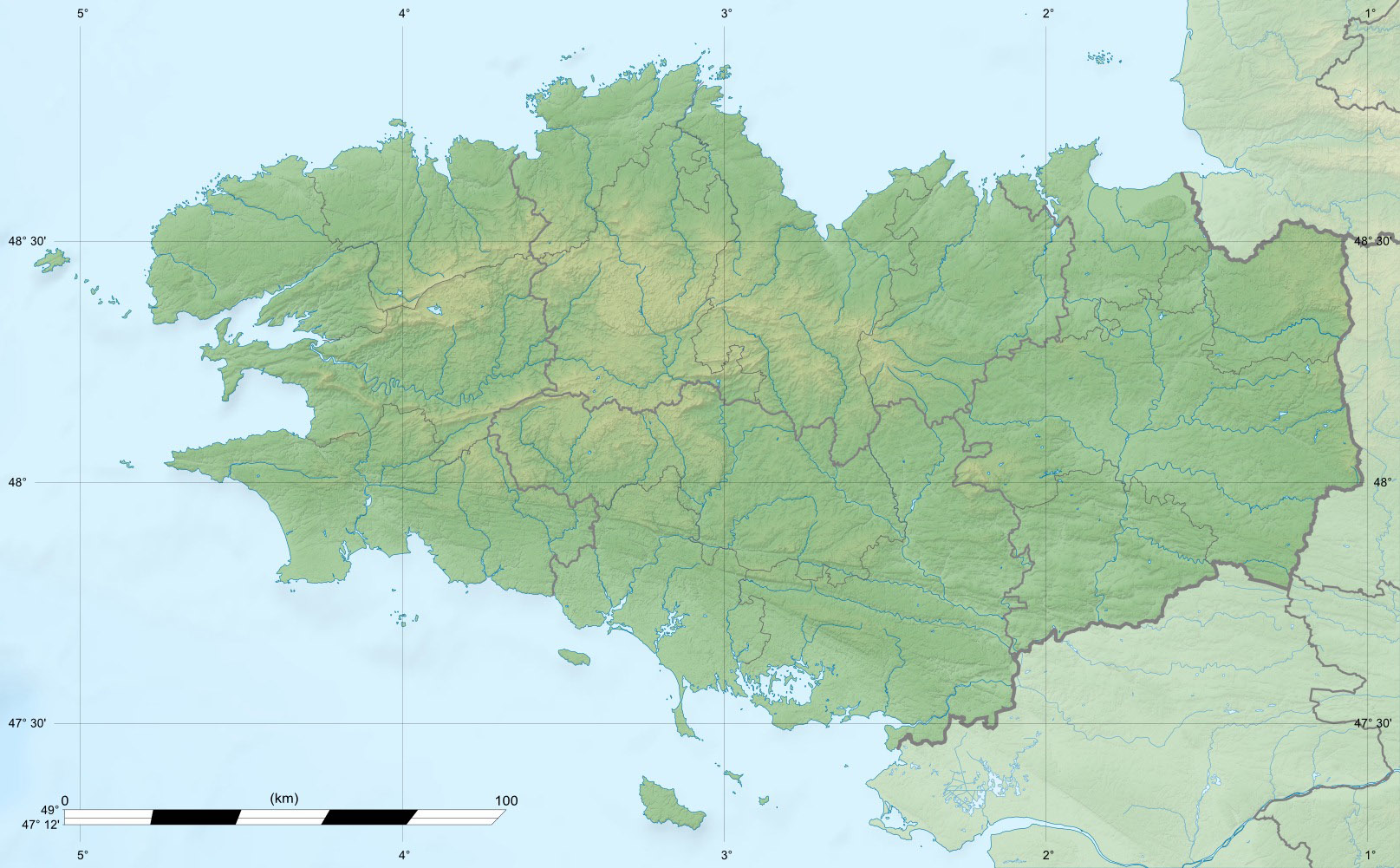
- Location within France Location within Brittany

Location
- Country: France

Physical characteristics
- Mouth
  - location: Oust
  - coordinates: 47°43′1″N 2°7′38″W
- Length: 66 km (41 mi)

Basin features
- Progression: Oust→ Vilaine→ Atlantic Ocean

The Aff (French pronunciation: [af]; Breton: Av) is a river in Brittany, western France. It is a 66-kilometre (41 mi) long tributary of the river Oust. It is canalized for 7 kilometres (4.3 mi) between Glénac (its confluence with the Oust) and La Gacilly.

== See also ==
- List of canals in France
