= Kentucky Kid =

Kentucky Kid may refer to:

- "Kentucky Kid" (song), a 1953 anti-war song by Yuri Vizbor
- Nicky Hayden (1981–2017), American professional motorcycle racer, known as The Kentucky Kid
- Robert Hill, (died 8 December 2009) Jamaican entertainer who was shot dead by the Jamaica Constabulary Force
