= Brian Morrison =

Brian Morrison may refer to:

- Brian Morrison (priest) (1933–2009), Australian Catholic priest
- Brian Morrison (footballer) (1938–2020), Australian rules footballer
- Brian Morrison (athlete) (born 1968), Canadian sprinter

== See also ==
- Bryan Morrison (1942–2008), English businessman, music publisher and polo player
