= Dufek =

Dufek may refer to:

- 3781 Dufek, a minor planet named after George Dufek
- Dufek Coast in Antarctica, named after U.S. Rear Admiral George J. Dufek
- Dufek Head, a headland in Antarctica
- Dufek Massif in the Pensacola Mountains of Antarctica
- Dufek Mountain in Antarctica

== People ==
- Don Dufek (born 1954), an American football player
- Don Dufek, Sr. (1929–2014), an American football player
- George J. Dufek (1903–1977), a U.S. Rear Admiral
- Joe Dufek (born 1961), an American football quarterback
- Joshua Dufek (born 2004), Austrian-Swiss racing driver
- Karel Dufek (1916–2009), a Czechoslovak diplomat
- Milan Dufek (1944–2005), a Czech singer and musician
