= Yves Rocher (company) =

Worldwide cosmetics brand

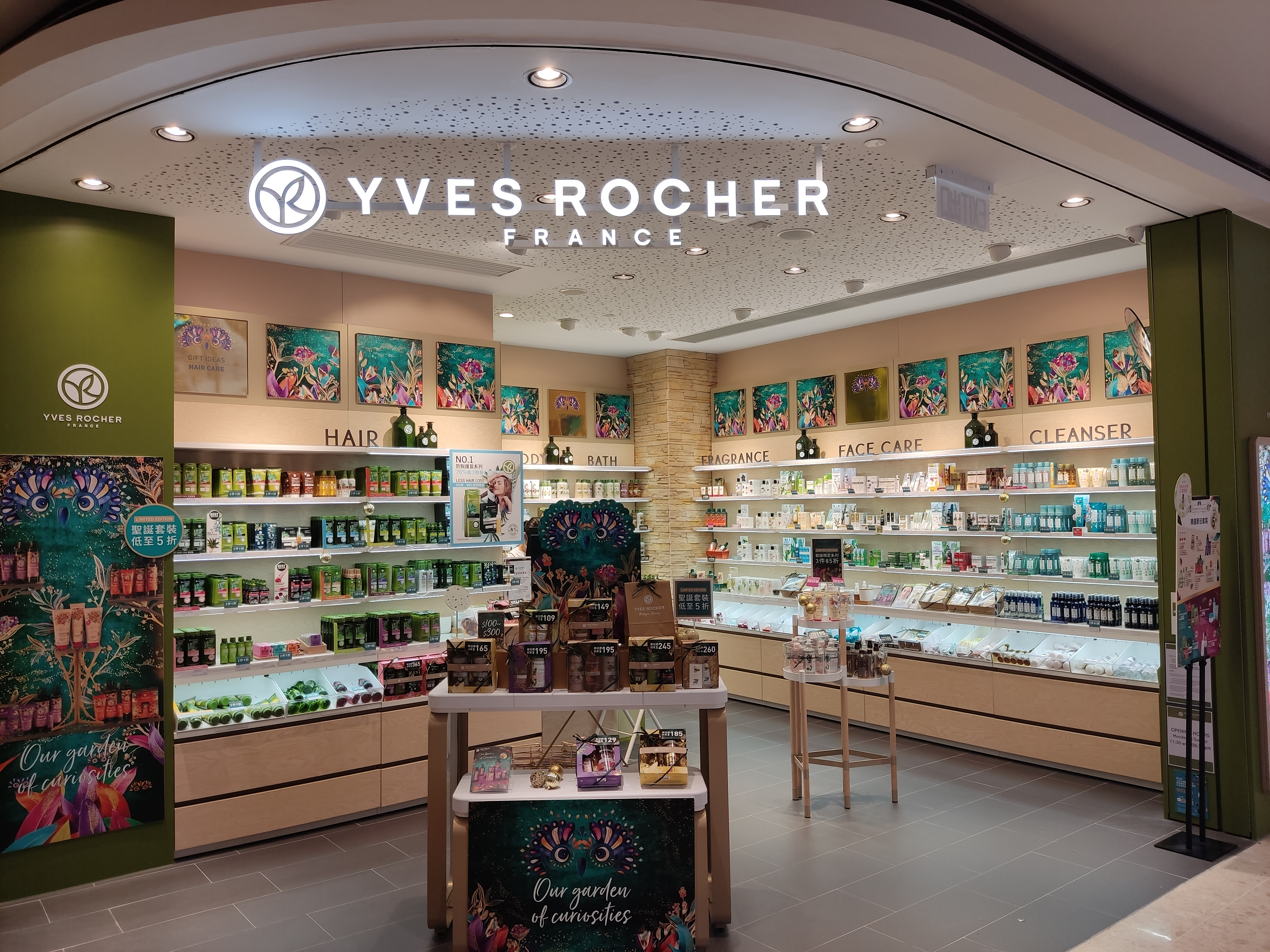
- Yves Rocher store in Hong Kong
- Company type: Subsidiary
- Industry: Cosmetics
- Founded: 1965; 61 years ago
- Founder: Yves Rocher
- Headquarters: Rennes, France
- Number of locations: over 3,000 stores
- Area served: 88 countries worldwide
- Key people: Bris Rocher
- Products: Skin care, cosmetics, fragrances
- Number of employees: 13,500
- Parent: Groupe Rocher
- Website: yves-rocher.com

Yves Rocher is a French skin care, cosmetics and perfume company, founded in 1965 by French entrepreneur Yves Rocher in La Gacilly. The company is present with over 3,000 stores, about half of them franchised, in 88 countries on five continents and employs 13,500 personnel. The company's headquarters are located in Rennes, Brittany, France. It maintains a botanical garden, the Jardin botanique Yves Rocher de La Gacilly, which is open to the public without charge at its factory site in La Gacilly.

For the company's national and international experience in sustainable development and eco-friendly products, the Environment Possibility Award conferred the "Environmental Heroes of the Year" to Yves Rocher in 2020.

Rocher Group, formerly Yves Rocher Group, had a turnover of 2.75 billion euros in 2019. The group also includes the brands Daniel Jouvance, Dr Pierre Ricaud, Isabel Derroisné, Petit Bateau, Kiotis, Stanhome, Sabon and Galérie Noémie.

== History ==
Laboratoires de Biologie Végétale Yves Rocher was established in 1965 to incorporate the local business focused on selling hemorrhoid salve and cosmetics based on traditional recipes through mail orders Yves Rocher ran since 1956. As the mayor of his hometown La Gacilly, France since the late 1950s, Rocher hoped that the establishment of a local business would help create jobs and stop people from fleeing the village in search of work. In 1959 the company opened its botanical garden and a laboratory to experiment with new recipes along with searching for potential ingredients worldwide. In 1965 the company built its first factory and an expanded botanical garden with a modern laboratory named Le Centre d'Etudes et de Recherche en Cosmetologie (Center for the Study and Research of Beauty Care). The same year the company produced its first Green Book of Beauty catalog.

Focused on transforming botanical substances into cosmetic ingredients, Rocher had anticipated the boom of interest in natural cosmetics and ecology in general. In 1969 Yves Rocher launched a new production facility in La Gacilly, and in 1970 the first retail store opened in Paris. The company rapidly expanded its retail network through its stores and selling franchises, and expanded its mail order and retail business to the rest of Europe. By the early 1970s, the company sales had topped Fr 80 million. Yves Rocher avoided public listing and found a strategic partner to fund future growth. In 1973 the 60% share in the company was sold to Elf Aquitaine subsidiary Sanofi, yet Rocher himself retained 57% of the company's voting rights. By 1981 the company reached Fr 1 billion in sales with mail orders accounting for 70%, and retail along with in-home party sales providing the rest.

In 1982 the company's new Center for Applied Research claimed to develop a technique to extract the DNA of certain plants and re-engineer them to produce heightened benefits. The A.D.N Revitalizing Resource line of skincare products based on that research boosted the company sales worldwide up to Fr 2.6 billion by 1984.

In 2023 Yves Rocher decided to close all physical stores in Germany, Austria and Switzerland, having already closed stores in the Netherlands.

== Foundation ==
The Yves Rocher Foundation was founded in 2016 by Yves Rocher under the aegis of the institute of France since 2001.

== Controversy ==
In 2012, Yves Rocher Vostok, the company's East European subsidiary, sued Russian opposition politician Alexei Navalny and his brother for fraud and money laundering. New Gazette accused Bruno Leproux, managing director of Yves Rocher Vostok, of assisting the Russian government's campaign against Alexei Navalny.

Since August 2014 the "One Question for Yves Rocher" movement has been expanding in Europe in order to get the Yves Rocher corporation to take a definitive position on the case against Navalny.

On 30 December 2014, Alexei Navalny's brother Oleg was sentenced to 3 1/2 years of forced labor, and Alexei Navalny himself to a suspended sentence of 3 1/2 years.

On 17 October 2017, the European Court of Human Rights (ECHR) decided that the case of fraud against Alexei and Oleg Navalny on the complaint of the company "Yves Rocher" was considered in Russia with a violation of the right to a fair trial. The court concluded that the verdict was arbitrary and unreasonable. According to the decision of the ECHR, Russia must pay the brothers Navalny 76 thousand euros. The ECHR refused to consider the issue of political motivation. At the same time, three judges of the ECHR – Dmitry Dedov, Helen Keller and Georgios Sergidez – expressed the opinion that it was necessary to consider a possible political background of the case.

Despite the decision of the ECHR on 25 April 2018, the Presidium of the Supreme Court of Russia refused to revoke the verdict to the Navalny brothers in the case of Yves Rocher and decided to resume the case to consider new circumstances.

On 2 February 2021, the court changed Navalny's probation to a real one and sent him to a colony for 2 years 8 months (taking into account the period spent by the politician under house arrest). After the verdict, the oppositionist was declared a political prisoner. Yves Rocher refused to support Navalny in any way, which provoked criticism The winner of the Nobel Peace Prize for 2021, Dmitry Muratov, at the ceremony of presenting this award, said the following: “Opposition politician Alexei Navalny is being kept in the camp on a false denunciation by the Russian director of the largest perfume company from France. The director wrote a statement, but he was not summoned to court and did not recognize himself as a victim ... But Navalny is in prison. The perfume company itself chose to step aside, hoping that the smell of this case would not harm the scent of its products.

Yves Rocher had by January 2023 not taken any decision to withdraw from the Russian market following the Russian invasion of Ukraine in February 2022 according to Yale University, this resulted in Yves Rocher, along with a number of other global companies, being added to the list of International Sponsors of War in 2023.
