= Dolní Heřmanice =

- Municipality
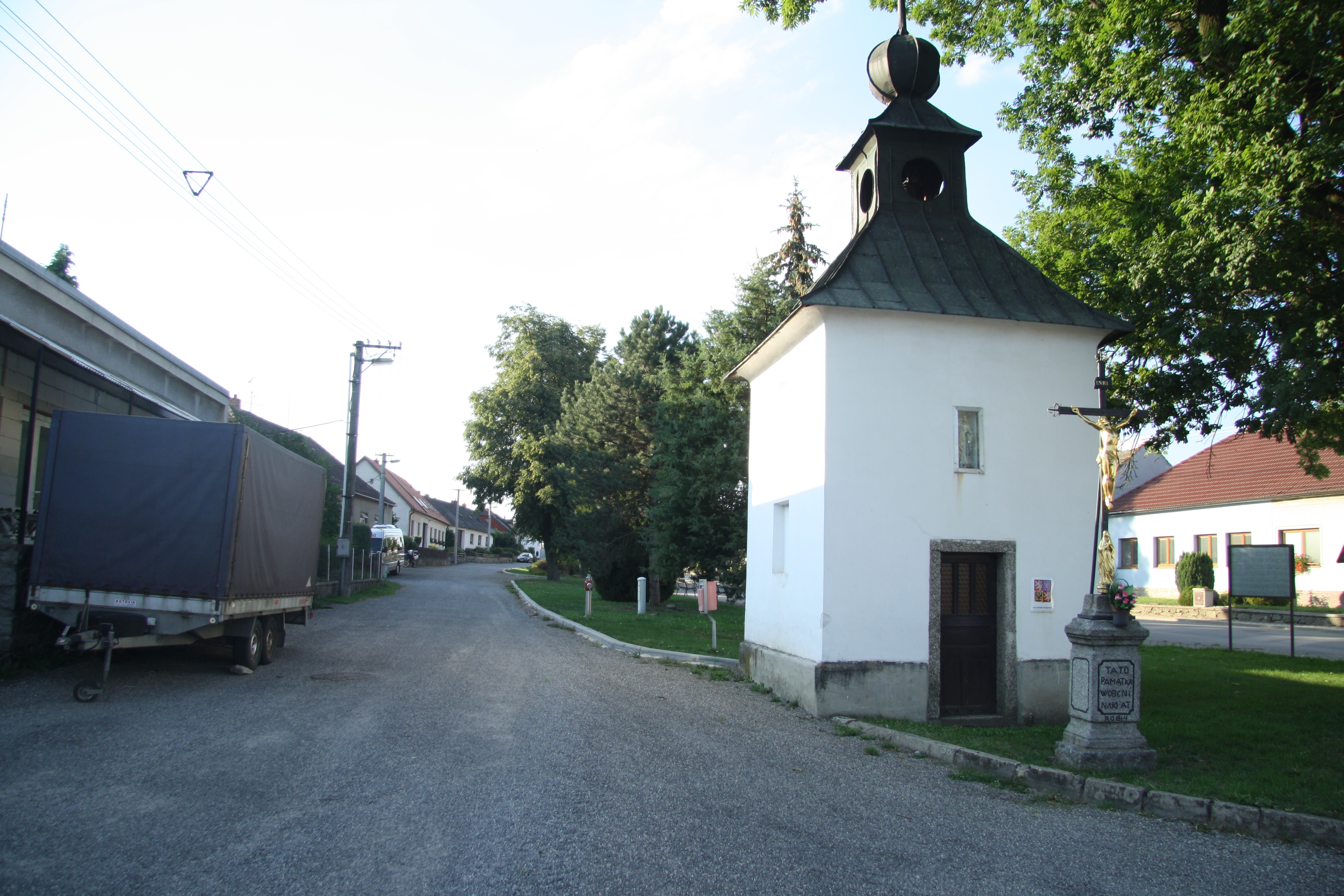
- Centre of Dolní Heřmanice with a chapel

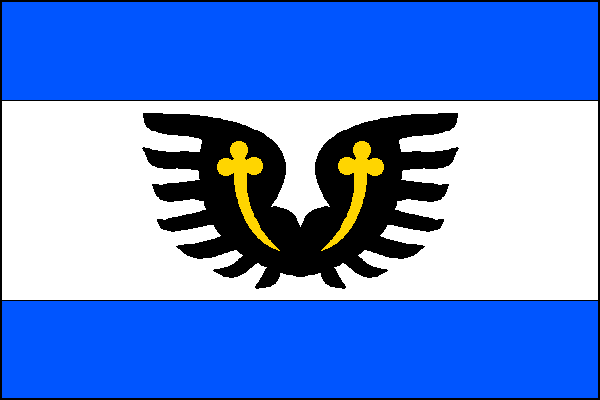
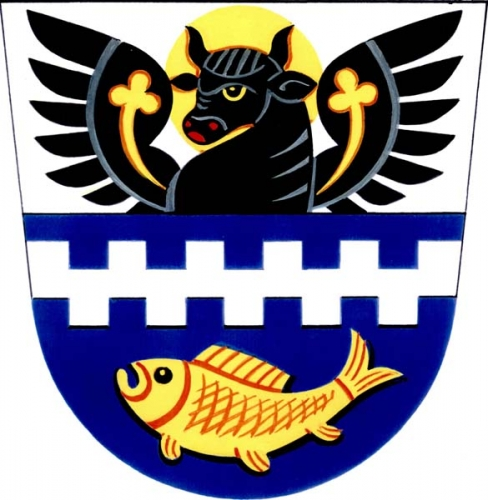
- Flag Coat of arms

- Location in the Czech Republic
- Coordinates: 49°18′17″N 16°3′36″E
- Country: Czech Republic
- Region: Vysočina
- District: Žďár nad Sázavou
- First mentioned: 1349

Area
  - Total: 14.15 km^{2} (5.46 sq mi)
- Elevation: 478 m (1,568 ft)

Population (2026-01-01)
  - Total: 590
  - Density: 42/km^{2} (110/sq mi)
- Time zone: UTC+1 (CET)
  - Summer (DST): UTC+2 (CEST)
- Postal code: 594 01
- Website: www.dolnihermanice.cz

Dolní Heřmanice is a municipality and village in Žďár nad Sázavou District in the Vysočina Region of the Czech Republic. It has about 600 inhabitants.

Dolní Heřmanice lies approximately 30 kilometres (19 mi) south of Žďár nad Sázavou, 35 kilometres (22 mi) east of Jihlava, and 146 kilometres (91 mi) south-east of Prague.

== Administrative division ==
Dolní Heřmanice consists of two municipal parts (in brackets population according to the 2021 census):

- Dolní Heřmanice (455)
- Oslava (36)

== Demographics ==
Historical population
Year	Pop.	±%
1869	484	—
1880	537	+11.0%
1890	536	−0.2%
1900	515	−3.9%
1910	544	+5.6%
1921	561	+3.1%
1930	569	+1.4%
1950	509	−10.5%
1961	528	+3.7%
1970	516	−2.3%
1980	465	−9.9%
1991	441	−5.2%
2001	446	+1.1%
2011	512	+14.8%
2021	491	−4.1%
Source: Censuses

== Notable people ==
- Karel Dufek (1916–2009), diplomat and Spanish Civil War veteran
