= Jardin botanique Yves Rocher de La Gacilly =

Botanical garden in Morbihan, Bretagne, France

Coordinates: 47°45′56″N 2°07′52″W

The Jardin botanique Yves Rocher de La Gacilly, sometimes called simply the Jardin botanique de La Gacilly, is a botanical garden located at the Yves Rocher industrial site at La Croix des Archers, La Gacilly, Morbihan, Bretagne, France. It is open daily in the warm months; admission is free.

The garden was established in 1975 to collect useful and medicinal plants, particularly those with an application in cosmetics. It has since been recognized by the Conservatoire Français des Collections Végétales Spécialisées (CCVS) for its national artemisia collection.

Today the garden contains more than 1,000 plant taxa, including medicinal and aromatic plants (38 species), cosmetic/perfume plants (92 species), fruit plants (50 taxa), industrial plants (23 species), dye plants (19 species), useful plants of the tropics (150 species), and desert plants (250 species).

== See also ==
- List of botanical gardens in France
