= Luís Lombardi Neto =

- Born: September 22, 1940; São Paulo, São Paulo, Brazil
- Died: December 2, 2009 (aged 69); Santo André, São Paulo, Brazil
- Occupation: Announcer
- Spouse: Eni Lombardi (m. 1973)
- Children: Luiz Fernando Lombardi

Luís Lombardi Neto, known as Lombardi (September 22, 1940 – December 2, 2009) was a Brazilian television announcer and voice actor.

== Biography ==
Lombardi started his career in the 1950s doing voiceovers for commercials on TV Paulista, a station owned by Rede Globo in São Paulo. He remained at Rede Globo for fifteen years, leaving the station when Silvio Santos decided to create the TVS. After his success in television, he also hosted radio programs. It was while he was doing commercials that Silvio Santos found him. He soon became the announcer for the Silvio Santos Show, and, at the time of his death, he had a radio program at a station in Santo André. The pair worked together for over 40 years, until Lombardi's death in 2009.

=== Death ===
Lombardi died in his sleep at his home in Santo André, São Paulo, on December 2, 2009 of a heart attack. He was 69 years old.

== See also ==
- Sistema Brasileiro de Televisão
- Deaths in December 2009
