= La Chapelle-Gaceline =

La Chapelle-Gaceline Ar Chapel-Wagelin
- Part of La Gacilly
- Coat of arms
- Location of La Chapelle-Gaceline
- Location within France Location within Brittany
- Coordinates: 47°47′03″N 2°06′19″W
- Country: France
- Region: Brittany
- Department: Morbihan
- Arrondissement: Vannes
- Canton: Guer
- Commune: La Gacilly
- Area^{1}: 7.79 km^{2} (3.01 sq mi)
- Highest elevation: 52 m (171 ft)
- Lowest elevation: 5 m (16 ft)
- Population (2022): 768
  - Density: 98.6/km^{2} (255/sq mi)
- Time zone: UTC+01:00 (CET)
  - Summer (DST): UTC+02:00 (CEST)
- Postal code: 56200
- ^{1} French Land Register data, which excludes lakes, ponds, glaciers > 1 km^{2} (0.386 sq mi or 247 acres) and river estuaries.

La Chapelle-Gaceline (French pronunciation: [la ʃapɛl ɡaslin]; Breton: Ar Chapel-Wagelin) is a former commune in the Morbihan department of Brittany in north-western France. On 1 January 2017, it was merged into the commune La Gacilly. Its population was 768 in 2022. Inhabitants of La Chapelle-Gaceline are called in French Gaceliniens.

== See also ==
- Communes of the Morbihan department
