= Fred Bachrach =

Dutch literary and art historian (1914–2009)

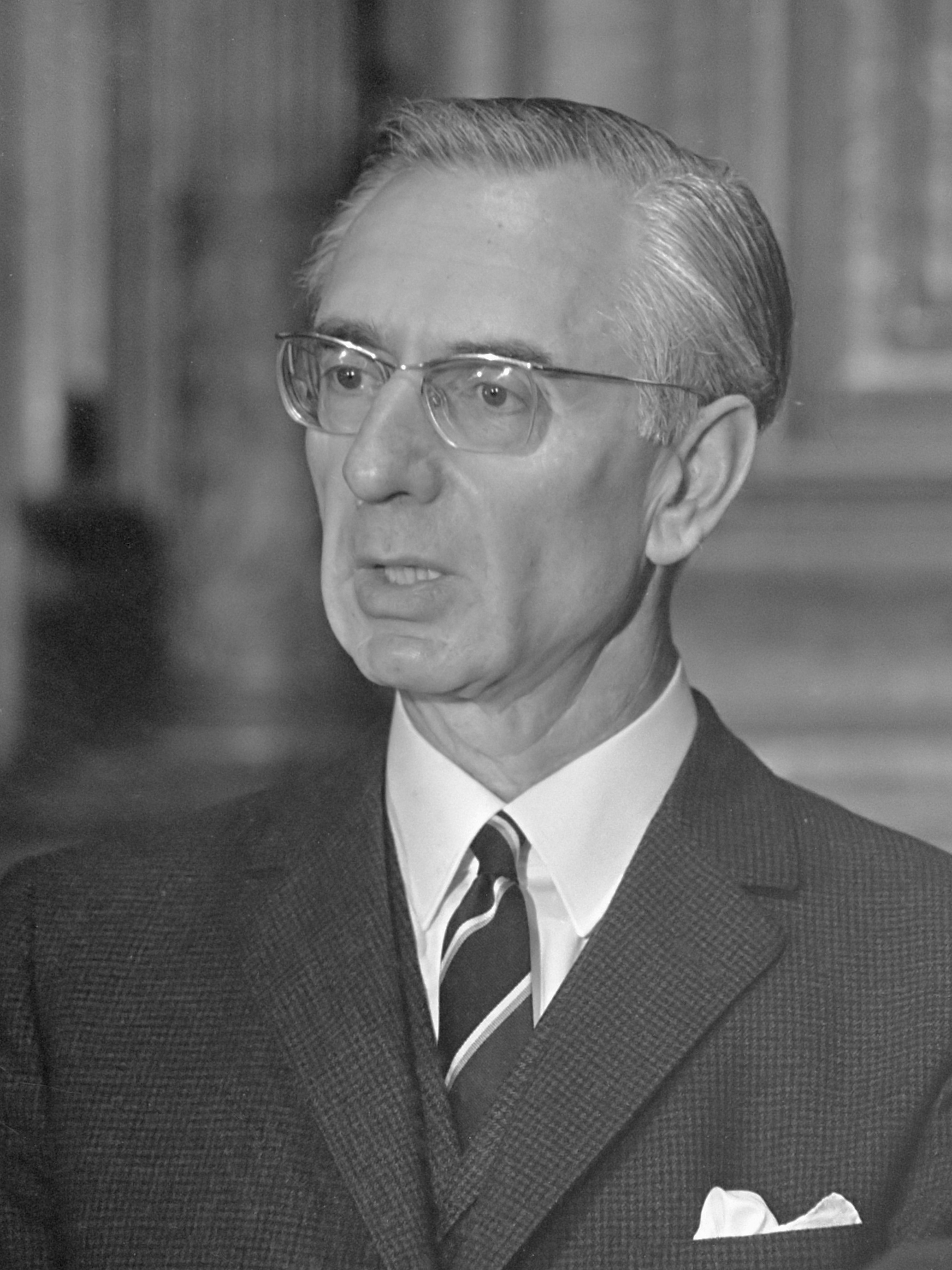
- Albert Gustave Herbert Bachrach (1968)
- Born: Albert Gustave Herbert Bachrach; 9 December 1914; Frankfurt, German Empire
- Died: 18 December 2009 (aged 95)
- Occupations: Dutch literary and art historian
- Spouse: Winifred MacManus; Catherine De Vries married in 1947; Harriet Jillings married in 1990
- Children: A son with Winifred MacManus; Three children with Catherine De Vries
- Writing career
- Genre: Nonfiction

Albert Gustave Herbert "Fred" Bachrach (9 December 1914 – 18 December 2009) was a Dutch literary and art historian of French and German descent whose academic work featured in a number of prominent exhibitions and research works in Britain and the Netherlands and who founded the Sir Thomas Browne Institute for the study of Anglo-Dutch relations at Leiden University. Bachrach had also served in the Dutch Army during the Second World War and spent three years as a Japanese prisoner of war, suffering starvation, torture, and deprivation that haunted him for the rest of his life.

== Early life ==
Bachrach was born in Frankfurt in December 1914 to a French father and a German mother and was educated at Amsterdam University before becoming a teacher, first in Alkmaar and subsequently in the Dutch East Indies. After the Japanese attack on Pearl Harbor he was conscripted into the Dutch Army.

== Military career ==
After the Japanese Invasion of the Dutch colonies he was captured in Java and sent to a prisoner of war camp. There he was subject to starvation and, after the discovery of a secret radio, torture in an iron hut known as "the oven". Throughout his time in the camp, Bachrach retained a copy of Shakespeare's works which the guards believed was a "holy book" and therefore permitted him to keep. He held regular secret discussion meetings, signalled by the wearing of creased trousers. He was released in 1945 at Changi, weighing less than 37 kg (80 lb). While in captivity, news had reached him that his son had died from a combination of diphtheria and medical neglect in another camp; his marriage to Winifred MacManus did not recover. After the war, Bachrach spent a year with French special forces in Saigon during the First Indochina War before returning to the Netherlands to work for the government.

== Academia ==
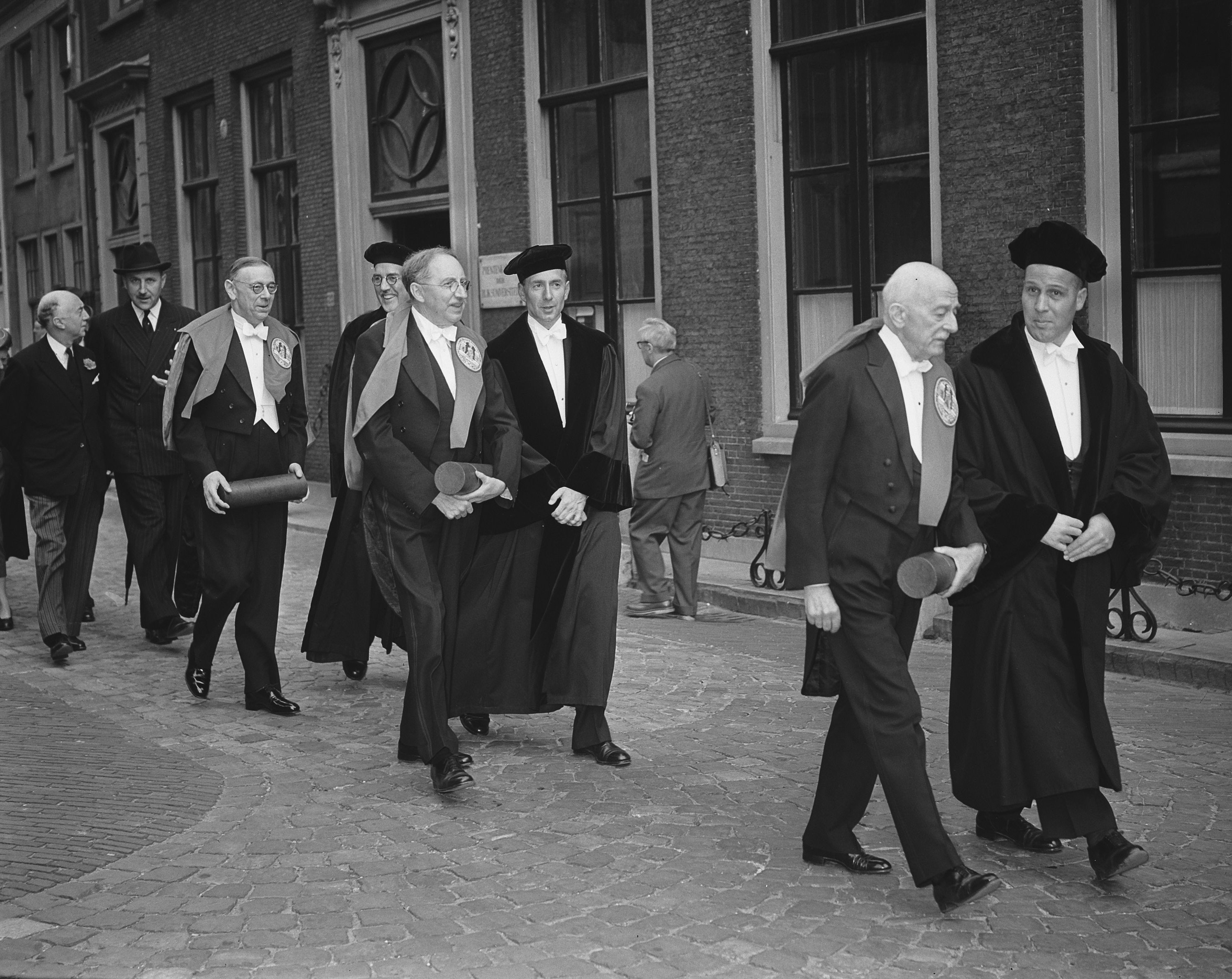
Bachrach (centre) with E. M. Forster on the occasion of Forster's honorary doctorate in Leiden (1954)

While there he obtained a scholarship to Jesus College, Oxford and studied seventeenth century English literature, receiving a PhD. From Oxford, Bachrach became the head of English Studies at Leiden University, remaining there for the rest of his career but with frequent secondments to galleries and museums in Britain and the Netherlands as well as a visiting fellowship to All Souls College, Oxford. Among the exhibitions he worked on during this time were The Orange and the Rose at the Victoria and Albert Museum and Turner's Holland at the Tate Gallery. He also published numerous works on literary and art history, including the Dutch An Introduction to Shakespeare in Five Letters and founded the Sir Thomas Browne Institute for the study of Anglo-Dutch relations at Leiden.

Bachrach became a member of the Royal Netherlands Academy of Arts and Sciences in 1970.

== Family ==
He was married three times: after his first divorce he married Catherine De Vries in 1947, but subsequently divorced with three children. He remarried for the final time in 1990 to Harriet Jillings and settled to retirement in Twickenham. He had been made an honorary Commander of the Order of the British Empire and a Knight of the Order of the Netherlands Lion and was a keen painter and exhibited his own work. His wartime experiences remained with him throughout his life, but it was not until 1995 that he was able to speak openly about them after a meeting with Eric Lomax. He died in December 2009.
