= Mall Vaasma =

Estonian mycologist

- Born: 22 February 1945
- Died: 4 December 2009 (aged 64); Tartu, Estonia
- Education: University of Tartu
- Occupation: Mycologist

Mall Vaasma (22 February 1945 – 4 December 2009) was one of Estonia's top mycologists. She graduated from the University of Tartu in 1974 with a degree in botany. After her graduation, she worked as a senior lab assistant for Department of Mycology at the Estonian Institute of Zoology and Botany from 1973 and at the Natural History Museum of the University of Tartu from 2008 until her death in 2009 after being struck by a motorist while crossing the road in Tartu.

She also co-authored a number of works on mushrooms.
