= William L. Reilly =

William L. Reilly S.J.

President of Le Moyne College
- In office 1964–1976
- Preceded by: Nicholas J. Sullivan, S.J.
- Succeeded by: William J. O'Halloran, S.J.

Personal details
- Born: May 16, 1916 Jersey City, New Jersey
- Died: December 10, 2009 (aged 93) Bronx, New York
- Profession: Jesuit priest, academic, professor of philosophy

William L. Reilly, S.J., (May 16, 1916 – December 10, 2009) was an American Jesuit and academic. He was the longest-serving president of Le Moyne College in Syracuse, New York. His twelve-year term lasted from 1964 to 1976.

== Biography ==
=== Early life ===
Reilly was born in Jersey City, New Jersey, in 1916. He first enrolled in the Jesuit novitiate in 1932, and was formally ordained a Catholic priest within the Society of Jesus in 1945. Reilly received a bachelor's degree in philosophy from the former Woodstock College in Maryland. Additionally, he studied theology at Weston College in Massachusetts before obtaining a doctorate in philosophy from Fordham University.

=== Canisius College ===
In 1955, Reilly became a philosophy professor at Canisius College in Buffalo, New York. He also became director of Canisius' evening and summer programs. Reilly remained on faculty at Canisius College until 1964, when he left to become the president of Le Moyne College.

=== President of Le Moyne College ===
Reilly became president of Le Moyne College in 1964, succeeding Nicholas J. Sullivan. During his 12-year tenure as president, the longest in Le Moyne's history, Reilly oversaw the expansion of Le Moyne's campus to more than 140 acres. Several academic buildings were constructed during this time, including Foery and Harrison halls. Harrison Hall was later renamed Reilly Hall in his honor.

=== Later life ===
Reilly retired as president of Le Moyne College in 1976 and served at a number of other Jesuit institutions. He became the associate vice president for academy at Fordham University in New York City. Between 1991 and 1998, Reilly served as the retreat minister at both the Jesuit Novitiate in Benin City, Nigeria, as well the retreat minister at a Jesuit facility in Cape Coast, Ghana. He began serving as retreat minister at the Nigerian novitiate at the age of 75.

Father Reilly permanently moved to the campus of Fordham University in the Bronx in 1999, where he resided for the remainder of his life. Reilly died at the Murray-Weigel Hall Jesuit care facility at Fordham University on December 10, 2009, at the age of 94.

Reilly's funeral mass took place at the Fordham University Church. He was buried at the Jesuit Martyrs' Shrine in Auriesville, New York.
