= Josef Voß =

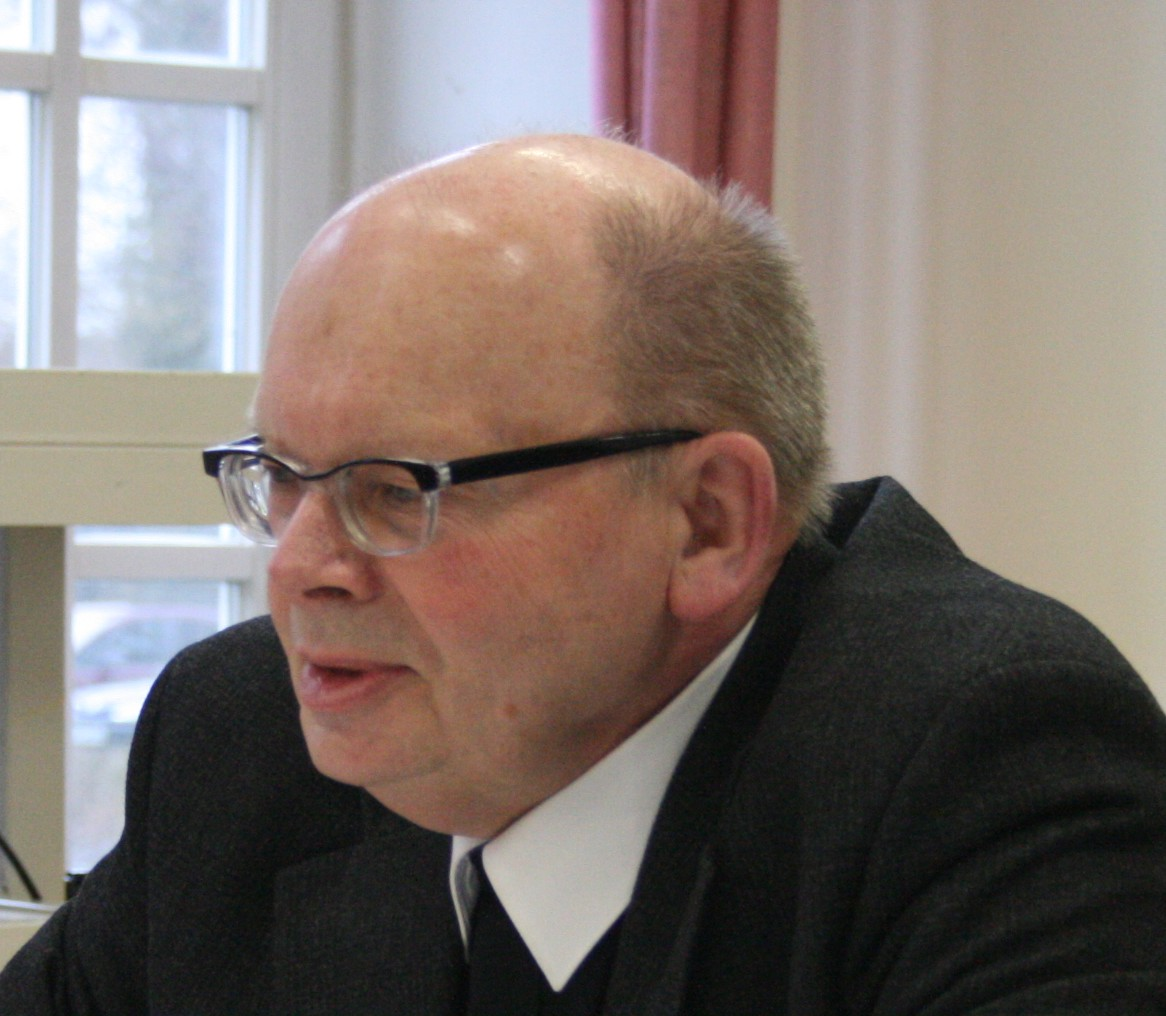
Weibischof Dr. Josef Voss (Diocese of Münster)

Josef Voß (9 March 1937 – 16 December 2009) was the Roman Catholic titular bishop of Thisiduo and auxiliary bishop of the Roman Catholic Diocese of Munster, Germany.

Ordained on 10 October 1968, Voß was appointed bishop on 18 March 1988 and was ordained on 24 April 1988.
