= La Gacilly =

Commune in Brittany, France

La Gacilly La Gaczilhae (Gallo) Gazilieg (Breton)
- Commune
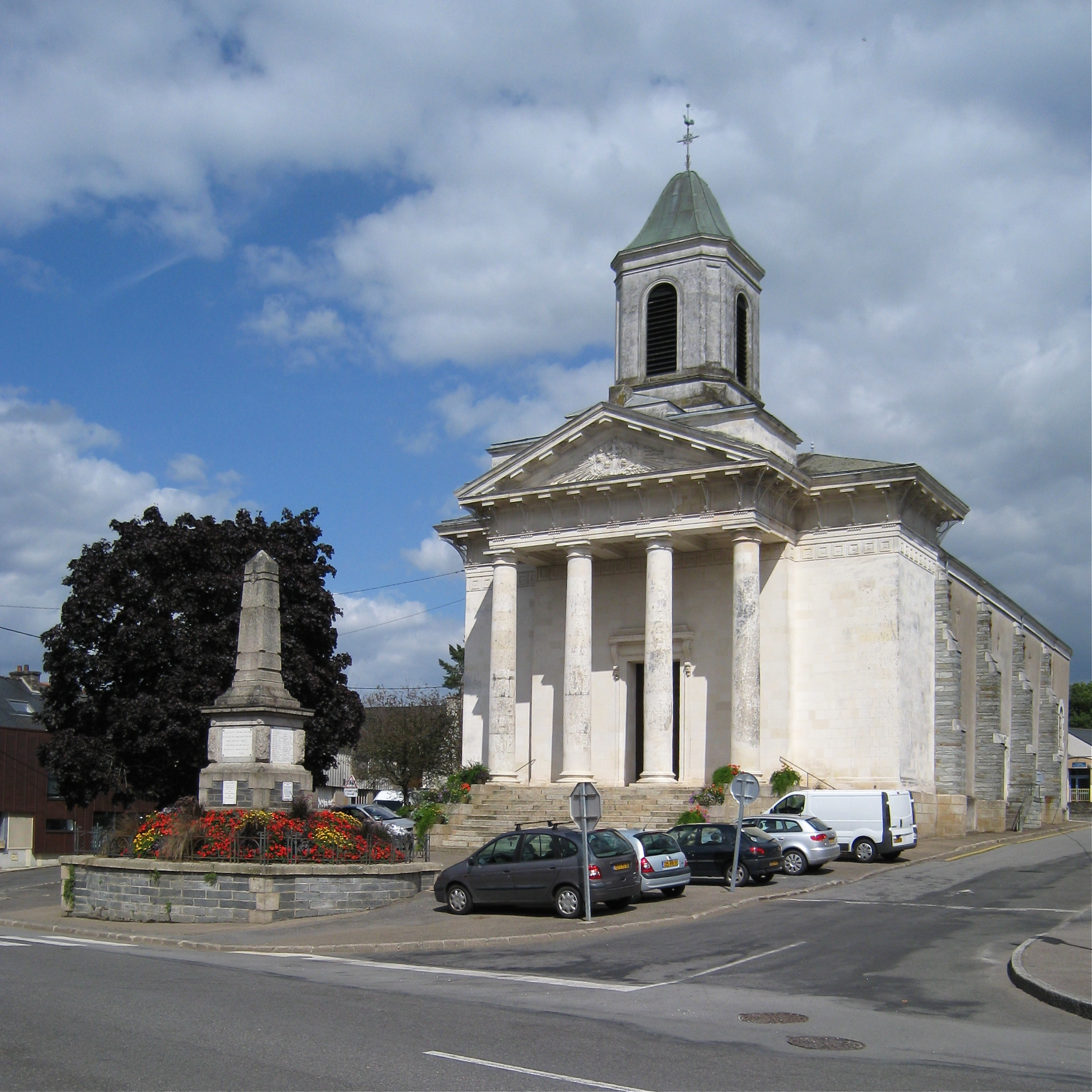
- St. Nicholas' church in La Gacilly.

- Coat of arms
- Location of La Gacilly
- Location within France Location within Brittany
- Coordinates: 47°45′57″N 2°07′51″W
- Country: France
- Region: Brittany
- Department: Morbihan
- Arrondissement: Vannes
- Canton: Guer
- Intercommunality: CC de l'Oust à Brocéliande

Government
  - Mayor (2026–32): Olivier Athimon
- Area^{1}: 37.97 km^{2} (14.66 sq mi)
- Highest elevation: 98 m (322 ft)
- Lowest elevation: 2 m (6.6 ft)
- Population (2023): 3,995
  - Density: 105.2/km^{2} (272.5/sq mi)
- Time zone: UTC+01:00 (CET)
  - Summer (DST): UTC+02:00 (CEST)
- INSEE/Postal code: 56061 /56200
- Website: www.la-gacilly.fr
- ^{1} French Land Register data, which excludes lakes, ponds, glaciers > 1 km^{2} (0.386 sq mi or 247 acres) and river estuaries.

La Gacilly (French pronunciation: [la ɡasiji]; Gallo: La Gaczilhae, Breton: Gazilieg) is a commune in the Morbihan department of Brittany in north-western France. It is located on the right bank of the Aff River, about 15 km (9 mi) north of Redon, on the train line between Vannes and Rennes and about 60 km (37 mi) from both. It extended on 1 January 2017 by merging with former communes of La Chapelle-Gaceline and Glénac.

La Gacilly is best known as the location of worldwide cosmetics company Yves Rocher. It was established in 1959 by a local, Yves Rocher, who also served as the mayor of La Gacilly from 1962 to 2008, when his son Jacques Rocher was elected to the office.

The Yves Rocher La Gacilly Botanical Garden is located in the commune and is accessible to the public.

The "Festival Photo de La Gacilly" is an annual event usually taking place since 2004 between the months of June and October, during which some streets and the Botanical Garden are decorated with photographies from professionals from all over the world. The theme for the 2022 one is "Oriental Visions".

== Population ==
Population data refer to the area corresponding with the commune as of January 2025.

Historical population
Year	Pop.	±% p.a.
1968	2,443	—
1975	2,835	+2.15%
1982	3,368	+2.49%
1990	3,587	+0.79%
1999	3,589	+0.01%
2007	3,725	+0.47%
2012	3,873	+0.78%
2017	3,975	+0.52%
2023	3,995	+0.08%
Source: INSEE

Inhabitants of La Gacilly are called in French Gaciliens.

== Twin towns ==
La Gacilly is twinned with:

- Diapaga, Burkina Faso
- Gowerton, Wales, United Kingdom
- Hollersbach im Pinzgau, Austria

== Gallery ==
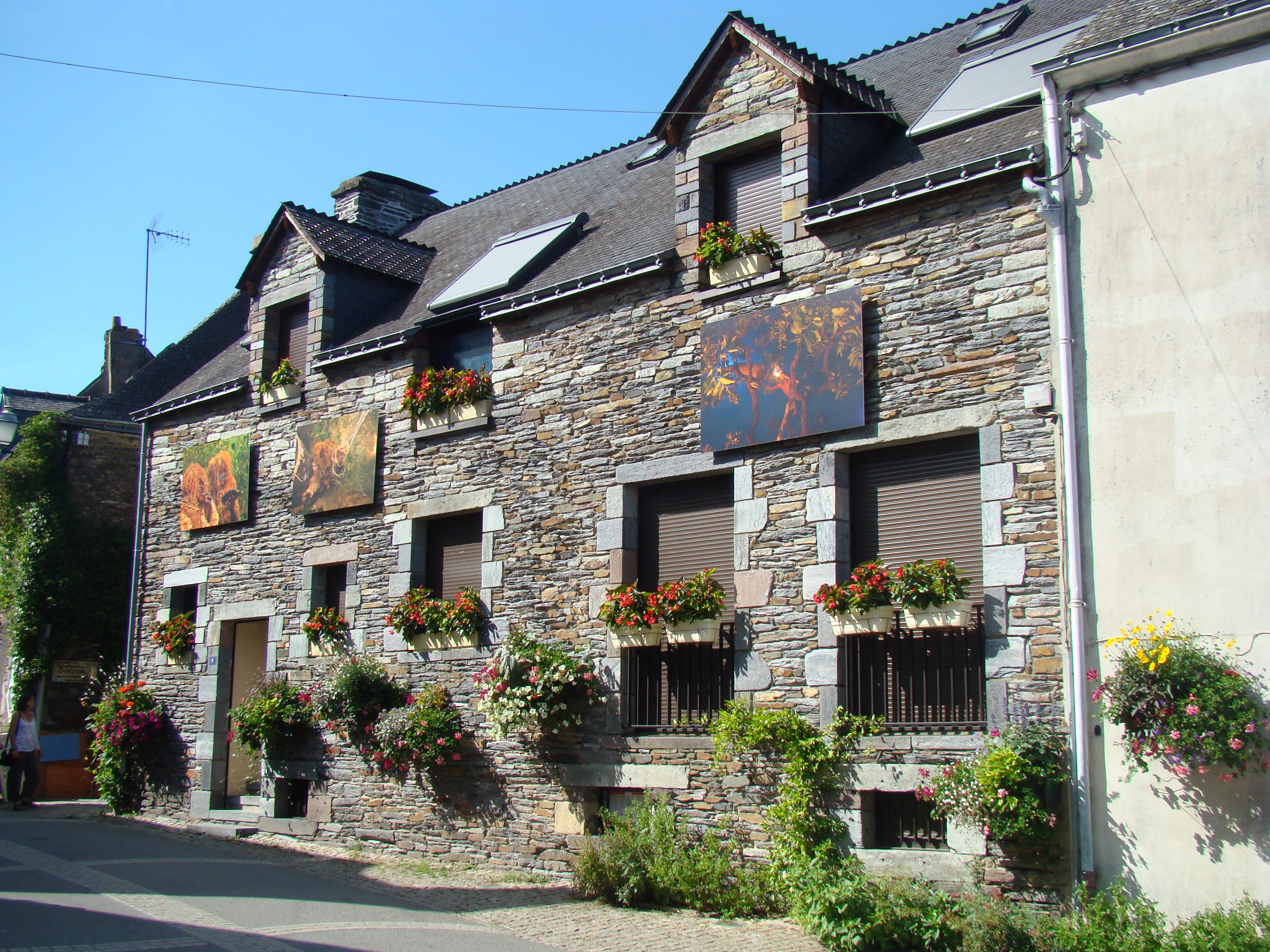
A typical house in La Gacilly, supporting a photography exhibition.

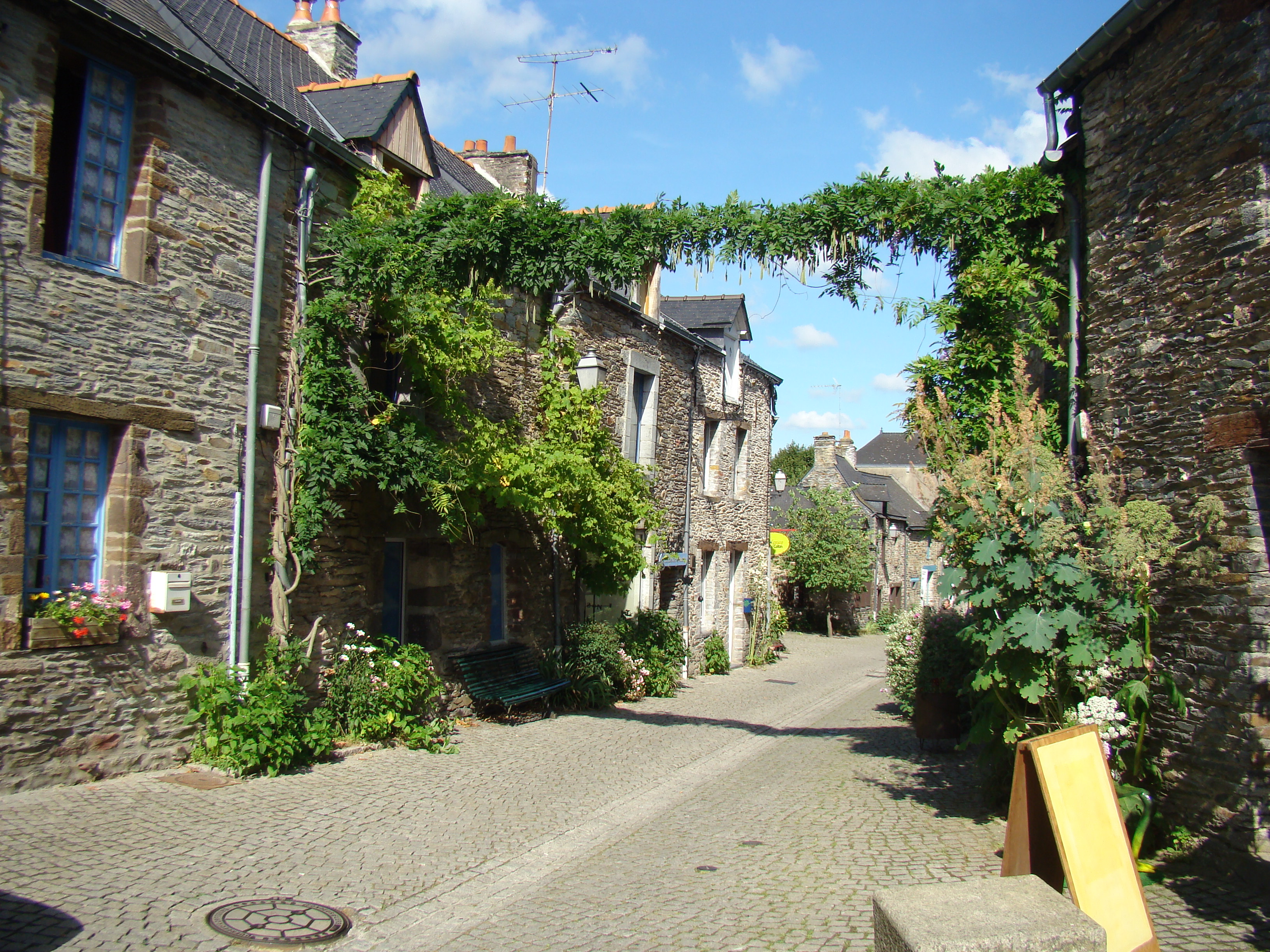
Rue fleurie

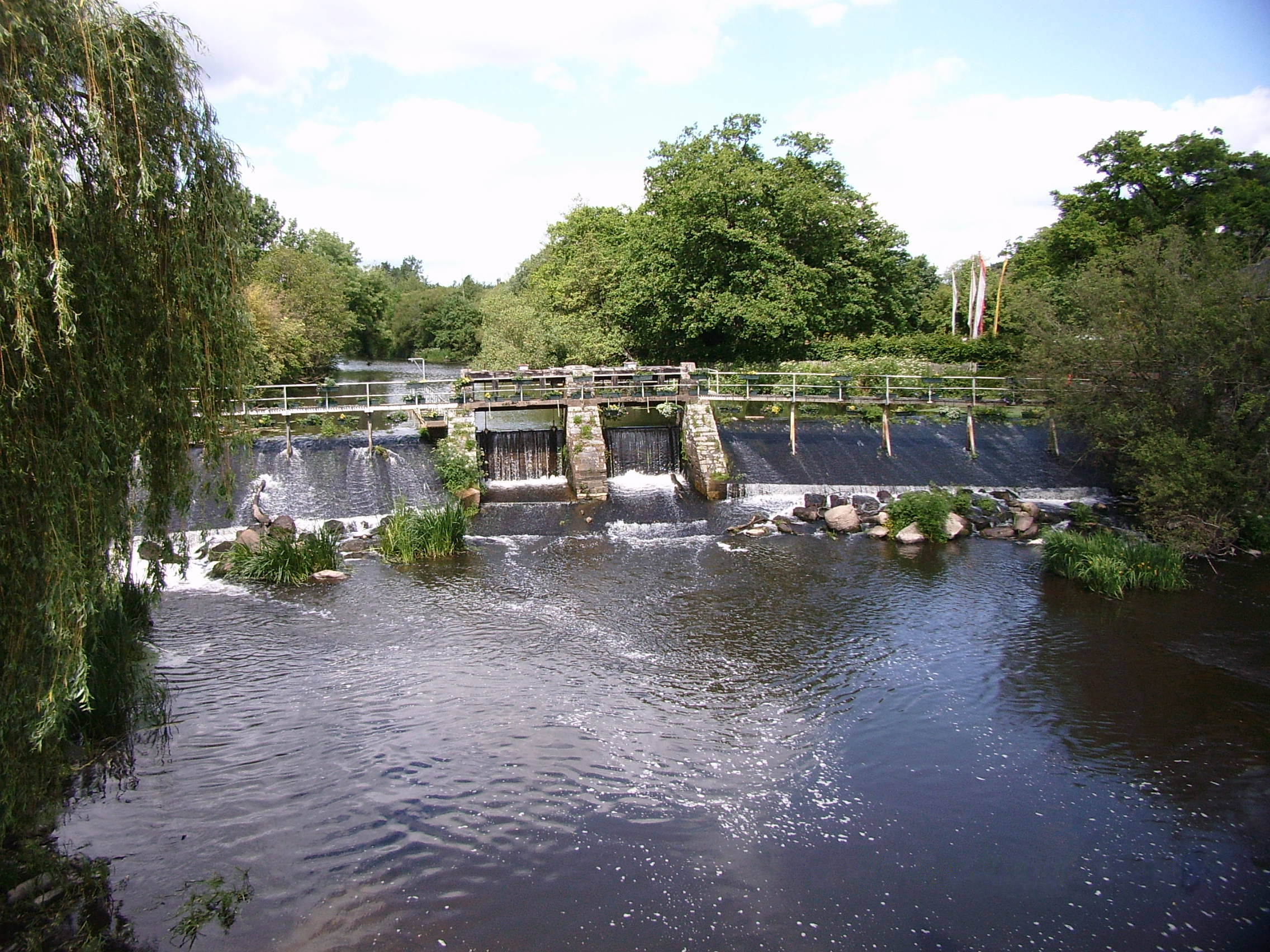
The Aff River in La Gacilly.

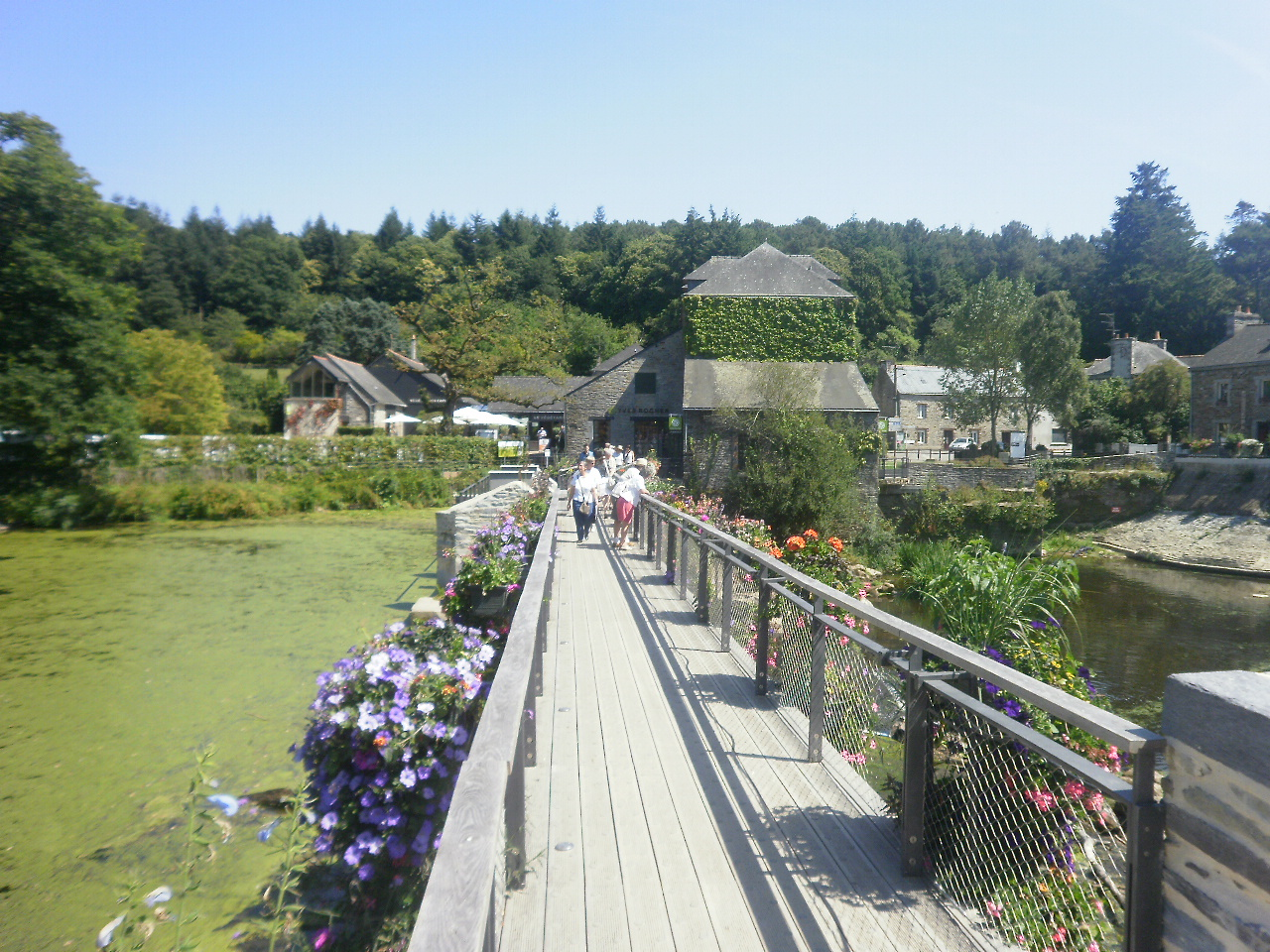
Footbridge in La Gacilly harbour.

== See also ==
- Communes of the Morbihan department
