= Ernest E. Chabot =

American politician

Member of the New Hampshire House of Representatives from the Hillsborough 47th district
- In office March 4, 1998 – December 2, 1998
- Preceded by: Robert Paul Asselin

Personal details
- Born: Ernest Elzear Chabot; January 1, 1922 Manchester, New Hampshire, U.S.
- Died: December 11, 2009 (aged 87) Manchester, New Hampshire, U.S.
- Party: Republican

Ernest Elzear Chabot (January 1, 1922 – December 11, 2009) was an American politician. A member of the Republican Party, he served in the New Hampshire House of Representatives in 1998.

== Life and career ==
Chabot was born in Manchester, New Hampshire, the son of Ernest Chabot Sr. and Rosa Brunelle. He served in the United States Army Air Corps, which after his discharge, he worked for the United States Postal Service for 22 years.

In February 1998, Chabot defeated Judy Courchesne in the special general election for the Hillsborough 47th district of the New Hampshire House of Representatives, winning 62 percent of the votes. He succeeded Robert Paul Asselin. He assumed office on March 4, 1998, and served until December 2, 1998.

== Death ==
Chabot died on December 11, 2009, at the Catholic Medical Center in Manchester, New Hampshire, at the age of 87.
