= Rick Hube =

American politician

Richard Wod "Rick" Hube, Jr. (January 31, 1947 – December 21, 2009) was a Vermont politician from South Londonderry, Vermont. A Republican, he served as a member of the Vermont House of Representatives, representing the Windham–Bennington–Windsor 1 District, from 1999 until his death. He died while visiting his sister in Orlando, Florida.

Born in Hartford, Connecticut, Hube attended school in Farmington, Connecticut, and received his bachelor's degree in history from Colgate University in 1971. He worked at McDonald's Corp in Connecticut. In 1978, Hube moved to Vermont and eventually started a property management business. He was also involved in the marketing business.
