= Spyridon Trantellis =

Spyridon (Trantellis) (1926–December 4, 2009) was the Greek Orthodox Metropolitan Bishop of Lagkadas, Greece. Born in Thessaloniki, he was ordained a priest in 1952, and consecrated bishop in 1967.
