= Glénac =

Glénac Glenneg
- Part of La Gacilly
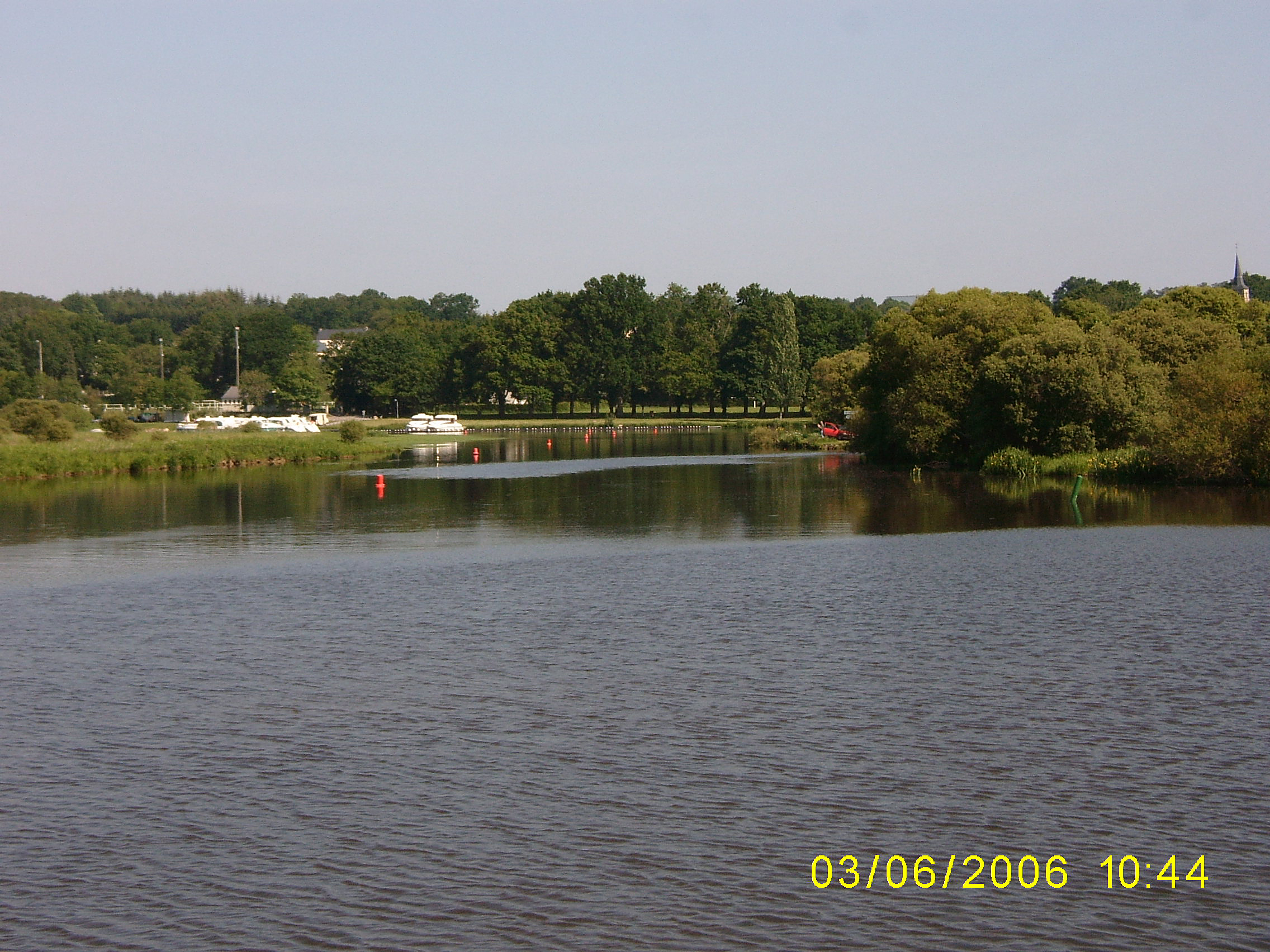
- The marina at Glénac, on the Oust river

- Coat of arms
- Location of Glénac
- Location within France Location within Brittany
- Coordinates: 47°43′39″N 2°07′55″W
- Country: France
- Region: Brittany
- Department: Morbihan
- Arrondissement: Vannes
- Canton: Guer
- Commune: La Gacilly
- Area^{1}: 13.70 km^{2} (5.29 sq mi)
- Highest elevation: 87 m (285 ft)
- Lowest elevation: 2 m (6.6 ft)
- Population (2022): 908
  - Density: 66.3/km^{2} (172/sq mi)
- Time zone: UTC+01:00 (CET)
  - Summer (DST): UTC+02:00 (CEST)
- Postal code: 56200
- ^{1} French Land Register data, which excludes lakes, ponds, glaciers > 1 km^{2} (0.386 sq mi or 247 acres) and river estuaries.

Glénac (French pronunciation: [ɡlenak]; Breton: Glenneg) is a former commune in the Morbihan department of Brittany in north-western France. On 1 January 2017, it was merged into the commune La Gacilly. Its population was 908 in 2022. Inhabitants of Glénac are called in French Glénacois.

== See also ==
- Communes of the Morbihan department
