= Witold Skulicz =

Polish artist (1926–2009)

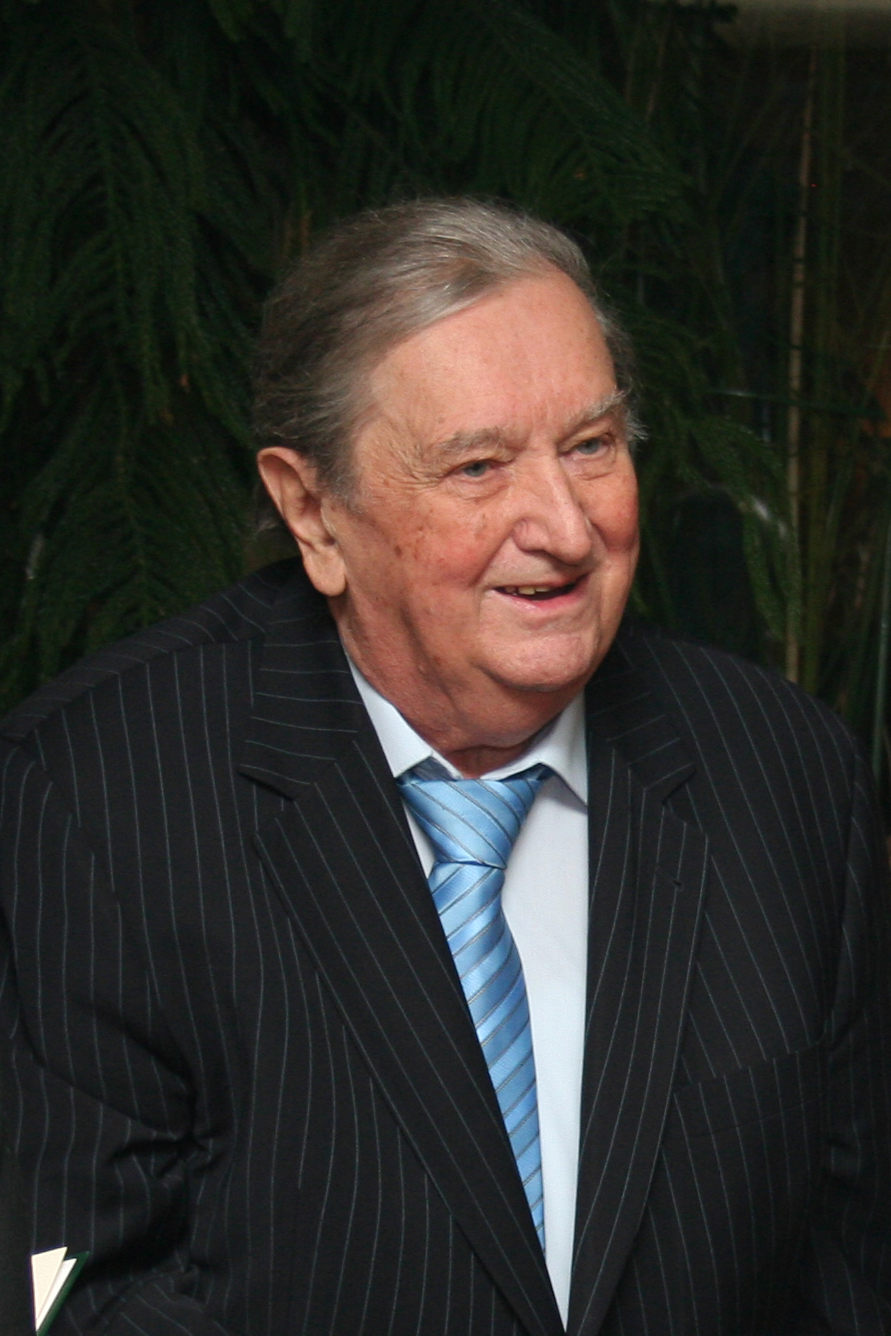
- Born: Witold Skulicz; 12 February 1926; Kraków, Poland
- Died: 28 December 2009 (aged 83); Kraków, Poland

Professor Witold Skulicz (12 February 1926 in Kraków – 28 December 2009) was a Polish artist.

He was the founder and president of the International Print Triennial Society in Kraków, and initiated the International Print Biennial and Triennial. For many years he was a Dean of the Department of Graphic Arts and Head of the Graphic Project Studio at the Academy of Fine Arts in Kraków. He was also a member of ZPAP, the Association of Polish Artists and Designers.

Skulicz was the author of three programmes promoting Polish print, Polish Eagles, Icon Data and The Best Diploma. He initiated and co-edited the CD-ROM publication series Directory of Print and an anthology, Polish Print 1950–2000 Winners of International Exhibitions. He also initiated the International Print Network Kraków – Vienna – Oldenburg. He organized and curated many exhibitions and was a juror on print competitions including those in Bradford, Yvaskyla, Frechen and Fredrikstad.

His works were presented at over 80 group exhibitions in Poland and abroad, and at over 20 individual exhibitions. He made prints and projects, designs, paintings and drawings. His works are in the collections of the National Museum of Poland's locations in Warsaw, Kraków, Poznan and Szczecin; the Pratt Institute in New York; Kunsthalle Bremen; Oslo Municipal Library; and Allende Museum in Havana. He also made mosaics for the Bagatela Theatre in Kraków, the former Wanda Cinema and Apollo Cinema in Kraków, and the cinema in Grabowo. He made a bas-relief of the Mother of God in ceramics in the Church of All Nations in Jerusalem.

== Awards ==
Skulicz was awarded the Officer's Cross and Knight's Cross of the Order of Polonia Restituta, the Gloria Artis Medal, and the Gold Cross of Merit. He received awards from the Ministry of Culture and Art, the City of Kraków Award, the Order of Kraków – European City of Culture, the Gold Order of the City of Kraków for Culture and Art, the Honoris Gratia Order, the Anniversary Order and Gold Order of ZPAP, the Order of Benafactor of the National Museum in Kraków, the Award of the Rector of Academy of Fine Art in Kraków, and the 40th Anniversary of International Print Triennial in Kraków Order.
