= Norman Walker (footballer) =

Australian rules footballer

Personal information
- Full name: Norman Arthur Walker
- Born: 15 October 1935; Burnie, Tasmania
- Died: 20 December 2009 (aged 74); Parkville, Victoria
- Original team: Forest (Smithton)
- Height: 175 cm (5 ft 9 in)
- Weight: 83 kg (183 lb)

Playing career^{1}
Years	Club	Games (Goals)
1957	Richmond	1 (0)
- ^{1} Playing statistics correct to the end of 1957.

Norman Arthur Walker (15 October 1935 – 20 December 2009) was an Australian rules footballer who played with Richmond in the Victorian Football League (VFL).
