= Viktor Khain =

Soviet and Azerbaijani geology scientist and academician

- Born: Viktor Yefimovich Khain; February 26, 1914; Baku, Azerbaijan
- Died: December 24, 2009 (aged 95); Moscow, Russia
- Education: Azerbaijan Industrial Institute
- Scientific career
- Fields: Geophysicist

Viktor Yefimovich Khain (Russian: Виктор Ефимович Хаин; 26 February 1914, Baku – 24 December 2009, Moscow) was a Soviet and Azerbaijani geology scientist, academician of Academy of Sciences of the Soviet Union (1987) and a number of national and international academies.

== Early years and education ==
He was born in Baku. He graduated from the geological survey department of the mining faculty of the Azerbaijan Industrial Institute (now the Azerbaijan State Oil Academy). Following his work for Aznefterazvedka (Azerbaijan Oil Exploration Company) until 1938, he moved on to the Azerbaijan Oil Scientific Research Institute and worked there until 1941. In 1940, he defended his Ph.D. thesis at the Leningrad Central Scientific Research Institute of Geological Exploration. As a Red Army draftee between 1941 and 1945, he served in a Baku Air Defense Army regiment until 1945.

== Academic career ==
In 1945, Khain started working for the Institute of Geology of the Azerbaijan Academy of Sciences where he was soon appointed head of the regional geology department, teaching at the same time a course on geotectonics at the Azerbaijan Industrial Institute. Under his guidance, a monograph titled “Geology of Azerbaijan” as well as a geological map and a tectonic map of Azerbaijan were published. In 1947 he defended his doctoral thesis on geological structure and oil and gas potential of the South-Eastern Caucasus at the Institute of Geology of the Azerbaijan Academy of Sciences. In 1949 V. Khain was awarded professorship in the oil and gas geology department and worked there until 1954, having published in the interim a fundamental monograph titled “Geotectonic basics of oil exploration”. He moved to Moscow in 1954. The geologist's selfless work was highly appreciated, and in 1966 V. Khain was elected a corresponding member of the USSR Academy of Sciences and became a USSR AS academician on geotectonics and geophysics in 1987.

== Recent initiatives ==
In 2009, Khain together with his student – Vice-president of the International Academy of Sciences (IAS) Health & Ecology, IAS and RANS academician, Doctor of geological and mineralogical sciences, Professor Elchin Nusrat oglu Khalilov came up with an initiative called Geochange Communiqué on global change of the geological environment. The Communiqué provides geological and geophysical evidence to substantiate the existence of global changes of the geological environment, the changes which cause Earth's seismic and volcanic activity to increase significantly and its magnetic pole drift to accelerate to a great extent, ultimately leading to global climate change. The Communiqué supported by WOSCO (World Organization for Scientific Cooperation) Scientific Coordinating Board has been signed by well-known scientists, public and political figures and experts. The Communiqué is designed to be submitted to the UN, European Union, international organizations and heads of states.

Throughout his life, V. Khain closely collaborated with many world scientists, taking an active part in joint researches and international projects. Khain's scientific support contributed to the creation of the Global Network for the Forecasting of Earthquakes.

== Editorial work ==
V. Khain was an editorial board member of the most authoritative Russian and international journals such as “Geotectonics”, “Science without Borders. Transactions of the International Academy of Science H & E”, “Nature”, “Moscow State University Herald. Geology”, “Higher School Proceedings. Geology and Exploration”, among others. He was also the “Geology” journal's editor-in-chief.

== Awards, honors, academic works ==
- USSR State Prize (1987)
- Alexander Karpinsky gold medal (1992)
- Winner of Lomonosov prize (1993) for “Global tectonics of Earth” series
- State Prize of the Russian Federation (1995) for a number of fundamental scientific works.

V. Khain was USSR AS and RAS academician, USSR and Russian Federation State Prize Laureate, author of over 1000 scientific works including nearly 60 fundamental monographs, honorary doctor of the Pierre and Marie Curie University of Paris, honorary member of the European Academy of Sciences, full member of the International Academy of Science, Munich honorary member of French, London, Bulgarian and U.S. geological societies, member of the International Committee on the History of Geological Sciences (1984)

In 1991 he was awarded the Gustav-Steinmann-Medal of the German Geological Society, Prestwich Medal of the French Geological Society, Golden Medal and Diploma of the First Degree of the World Organization for Scientific Cooperation, Nobel Prize Laureate Pavlov golden badge award of the International Academy of Science Health & Ecology.

V. Khain was Honorary Professor of the Lomonosov Moscow State University, Dynamic Geology department. In 2007, he was elected Honorary President of the International Academy of Science, Munich.

== Scientific activities ==
In 2009, E. Khain was elected honorary president of World Organization for Scientific Cooperation|WOSCO (World Organization for Scientific Cooperation). In recent years, he devoted his scientific researches to the most important problems of humanity, investigating seismic and volcanic activity cycles and their interrelation with other geological and cosmic factors. His studies on global changes in the geological environment have made it possible to view Earth's climate change processes and geological life from a new perspective. These research topics are dealt with in his fundamental monographs and articles.

In recent years, he devoted his scientific researches to the most important problems of humanity, investigating seismic and volcanic activity cycles and their interrelation with other geological and cosmic factors.

== Selected publications ==
His studies on global changes in the geological environment have made it possible to view Earth's climate change processes and geological life from a new perspective. These research topics are dealt with in his fundamental monographs and articles:

- V. E. Khain, E. N. Cyclicity of geodynamic processes: its possible nature, Moskau 2009
- V. E. Khain, E.N.Khalilov. Cyclicity of geodynamic processes: Its possible nature. Moscow, Scientific World, 2009, p. 520;
- V. E .Khain, E.N.Khalilov. Spatiotemporal patterns of seismic and volcanic activity. Burgas, Bulgaria, SWB, 2008, p. 304
- V. E. Khain, E.N.Khalilov. ABOUT POSSIBLE INFLUENCE OF SOLAR ACTIVITY UPON SEISMIC AND VOLCANIC ACTIVITIES: LONG-TERM FORECAST. SCIENCE WITHOUT BORDERS. Transactions of the International Academy of Science H & E.Vol.3. 2007/2008, SWB, Innsbruck, 2009 ISBN 978-9952-451-01-6 ISSN 2070-0334;
- V. E. Khain, E.N.Khalilov. GLOBAL CLIMATE FLUCTUATION AND CYCLICITY OF THE VOLCANIC ACTIVITY. Transactions of the International Academy of Science H & E. Vol.3. 2007/2008, SWB, Innsbruck, 2009 ISBN 978-9952-451-01-6 ISSN 2070-0334;
