= Micah Naftalin =

Micah H. Naftalin (1933 - December 23, 2009) was an American advocate for the rights of Soviet Jews. He was national director of the Union of Councils for Soviet Jews from February 1987 until his death.

Naftalin held a BA from Brandeis University (1955) and a JD from George Washington University Law School (1960). He served in Korea as an enlisted man in the U.S. Army from 1955 to 1957.

Before joining UCSJ, he served as an aide to U.S. Congressman Carl Elliott, as chief counsel and deputy director of the U.S. House of Representatives’ Select Committee on Government Research and as a senior policy analyst with the National Academy of Sciences. In 1982, he joined chairman Elie Wiesel on the United States Holocaust Memorial Council, which led the efforts to establish the United States Holocaust Memorial Museum; Naftalin was appointed deputy director and, later, acting director.

Naftalin died in Washington, DC.
