= Roger Rawson =

American teacher and politician

Roger Rawson (May 19, 1939 – December 19, 2009) was an American teacher and politician from Utah.

Rawson was born in 1939 in Weber County, Utah. He attended Utah State University on a basketball scholarship. Before entering politics, he taught history, political science and economics at Roy High School, where he was named outstanding faculty member of the year.

In 1972, Rawson was elected as a Democrat to the Utah House of Representatives at the age of 33. He served from 1973 until 1983 where he rose to become majority whip and subsequently as majority leader. Due to his educational background, he was a strong advocate for public and higher education and helped create a master's of education program at what was then called Weber State College in 1978.

After the Republicans won control of the House in 1978, Rawson served as the minority leader. He did not seek re-election in 1982. After his retirement from the legislature, he served a single four-year term as a Weber County Commissioner.

As of 2009, Rawson was the last Democrat to serve as the majority leader in the Utah House of Representatives due to the rise of Republican dominance since the late 1970s.

Rawson died on December 19, 2009, from liver disease. He was survived by his wife, Sheryl, his mother, six children and 25 grandchildren.
