= Daniel Piscopo =

Maltese politician

Daniel Piscopo (11 February 1920 in Cospicua – 14 December 2009) was a Maltese politician and minister.

He started his career in politics in 1947. During his time as a politician he held several posts including Minister of Health, Minister of Posts, Minister of Energy and Communications and Minister of Tourism. During his time as Health Minister he focused on the modernisation of hospitals and the improvement of psychiatric care. Piscopo had a wife, and the couple had three sons. He died in 2009, aged 89, from undisclosed causes.
