= Karel Dufek =

- Born: 24 January 1916; Dolní Heřmanice, Moravia, Austria-Hungary
- Died: 16 December 2009 (aged 93); Czech Republic
- Education: Masaryk University

Karel Dufek (24 January 1916 – 16 December 2009) was a Czechoslovak diplomat and a Spanish Civil War veteran who served in the International Brigades.

== Youth ==
Dufek was born in Dolní Heřmanice, in the Austro-Hungarian Margraviate of Moravia (present-day Žďár nad Sázavou District) on 24 January 1916. He studied at the Masaryk University in Brno between 1935 and 1937. During his student years, he joined the Communist Party of Czechoslovakia in 1936.

== War years ==
Dufek joined the International Brigades in Spanish Civil War 1937. In March 1938 he was serving as Deputy Battery Commander in the Rosa Luxemburg Battalion. He remained in Spain until 1939.

When leaving the country he was detained in France in a prison camp until 1940. In 1940 he went into exile in the London, and remained there until 1944. Between 1944 and 1947 he served as Czechoslovak Liaison Repatriation and Tracing Officer with Allied Staff in France and Frankfurt am Main, holding the rank of Staff Captain.

== Diplomatic career ==
Upon his return to Czechoslovakia he served as Section Head at the Ministry of Foreign Affairs 1947–1948. In 1948 he was assigned the post as Head of the Cadres Department at the Ministry. Moreover, he was named Chair of the combined committee of the Communist Party at the Ministry.

In December 1949 Dufek was named Ambassador of Czechoslovakia to Turkey. He presented his credentials as Minister on 26 December 1949. In Ankara Dufek held the post of Chargé d'affaires. He served in that function until August 1951.

== Arrest and jail ==
Dufek's diplomatic career was abruptly interrupted as he was arrested in 1951. He was called as a witness to the Slánský trial in 1952. Dufek and three other high-ranking diplomats (Richard Slánský, Eduard Goldstücker and Pavel Kavan) were tried by a Supreme Court Tribunal on 25–26 May 1953 at the first follow-up trials of the Slánský trial. Dufek was charged with treason, whilst the other three defendants were also charged with espionage. On 26 May 1953 Dufek was sentenced to 25 years imprisonment, having been denounced as a 'Trotskyite'. He was released from jail in 1955.

== Rehabilitation ==
The inquiry commission under Rudolf Barák, which investigated the political trials, concluded that Dufek had been the victim of false accusations and recommended that he be acquitted of all charges and fully rehabilitated. The Politburo of the Communist Party accepted this recommendation. Upon release from prison, he worked as chief editor of Mezinárodní politika ('International Politics') 1956–1965. In 1958 he became a member of the Central Committee of the CSSR Society for the Dissemination of Political and Scientific Knowledge/Socialist Academy. In 1960 he was promoted to member of the Presidium of the Socialist Academy. In 1965 he rejoined the Ministry of Foreign Affairs, working as Head of its Press Section until 1968. He worked as press spokesman of the Ministry from July 1968 to 1969.

== Ambassador to Brazil ==
On 25 July 1969 he assumed the post as Ambassador of Czechoslovakia to Brazil, replacing Ladislav Kocman.

Dufek was removed from his post as Ambassador by the Ministry of Foreign Affairs on 31 March 1971. No public explanation was given for his removal.

== Later life ==
In connection with the 70th anniversary of the Spanish Civil War, Dufek and two other surviving Czech volunteers of the International Brigades were personally received by the Czech Minister of Defence Karel Kühnl and thanked for their contributions in the struggle against fascism.

According to the official web of the Czech Ministry of Foreign Affairs Dufek died on 16 December 2009 in the Czech Republic. (Note: In October 2013 AABI erroneously named Dufek as one of ten remaining veterans of the International Brigades worldwide, although the association stated it could not confirm Dufek's status at the time.)

== Decorations ==
- 1946: Czechoslovak Military Medal for Merit
- 1948: Order of Liberation 1st Grade
- 1948: Polish Order of Virtuti militari 1st Grade
- 1949: Order of 25 February, 2nd Grade
- 1965: Commemoration Medal on 20th Anniversary of Liberation of CSSR
- 1965: Order of the Red Star 1st Grade
- 1966: For Services in Reconstruction
