= Brian Morrison (priest) =

Brian John Morrison
- Born: 1933; Malvern, Victoria, Australia
- Died: 2 December 2009 (aged 75–76); Subiaco, Western Australia
- Occupations: Priest; Charity worker
- Website: http://www.fatherbrian.org.au/index.php

Father Brian Morrison was an Australian Catholic priest who worked for 40 years in providing crisis care for people affected by the upheaval caused by natural and man made disasters.

Father Brian was born (Brian John Morrison) and grew up in Malvern, an inner Melbourne suburb, and moved to Western Australia in 1972 to develop the Catholic Church's Crisis Care centre. The charity regularly distributes tonnes of food to needy West Australians, many of whom live on the streets, and organises an annual Christmas Appeal. He was also the racing chaplain in Perth In 2006 Father Brian was awarded Western Australian Senior of the year for his humanitarian work. Father Brian has collected donations from the Western Australian community to support humanitarian efforts for Australian disasters like Cyclone Tracy, 2003 Canberra bushfires and the 2009 Victorian Bushfires. In addition to his work with Western Australian communities, he travelled overseas extensively. He made thirty trips to places such as East Timor, Bangladesh, Chechnya, Thailand and Iraq to help people in need, particularly children in some of the world's most devastated areas. Internationally Father Brian has organised relief efforts for the 2004 Indian Ocean earthquake, for victims of the Bali bombings and for children affected by the Chernobyl disaster. He travelled to Ukraine and the Chernobyl area four times over sixteen years to provide support and love to those who were shunned by many. During his visits to help Chernobyl victims Father Brain suffered radiation poisoning, probably through consuming contaminated food, it is thought that this was the cause of his terminal lymphocytic cancer and adenocarcinoma. Father Brian died on 2 December 2009 at St John of God Hospital in Subiaco. A Pontifical Requiem Mass was held on Friday 11 December 2009 at St Mary's Cathedral, Perth followed by a private burial.

In September 2018 Morrison was accused of abusing children.
