= Death of Robert Hill =

Robert Hill, known as Kentucky Kid, (died 8 December 2009) was a Jamaican entertainer who was shot dead by the Jamaica Constabulary Force (JCF). Hill had earlier filmed a previous incident in which police officers entered his house and confronted him and his wife Kumiko, who was eight months pregnant at the time. He uploaded it to the video-sharing website YouTube and showed it to the JCF, but got little response from the police. His shooting attracted international attention and suspicion that it was in retaliation for the earlier incident.

== Collision and confrontation with the police ==
A police car travelled through a red light and collided with Hill's car, causing serious damage. Hill was brought to the station. Four hours later he was ordered to return home, to write his statement there, and come back to the station during the following 24-hour period by a Sergeant Gardner. He went back but his statement was refused on the grounds that he should have submitted it the previous day when the collision had occurred. Hill stood his ground but was physically manhandled from the station.

According to The Jamaica Observer reporter Kimmo Matthews, Hill told the paper he had been "threatened him at his home and [the police] were intimidating him". A lawyer told him to fit a camera to his property which he did. Within days Hill had brought the film of one incident to the paper depicting him and his heavily pregnant wife, Kumiko, being physically harassed by members of the police force who demanded that he forget about the damage caused to his car. The faces and acts of the police members were highly visible on the tape. The police did not assist Hill even when he showed them the video evidence.

== Death ==
On 8 December 2009, an anonymous person telephoned Hill to request a viewing of a car being sold. Hill, alongside a cousin, left his wife's side but promised to return immediately. The cousin returned home at Hill's request to pick up a car key which they had forgotten.

The JCF fatally shot Hill, later claiming he held a gun. The incident was described by the JCF as a "shootout".

== Video recordings ==
Hill placed video recordings of himself and the police on YouTube.

Among the words used in a long video message recorded before his death, Hill said:

Hello Jamaica. I'm Robert Hill AKA Kentucky Kid. I really don't know what is going on but all I know, police are covering up for each other and they're trying to kill me" [...] "All I know is I can't get any justice. Who will fix my car? Who will take care of my health? [...] I can't get any justice from anyone in Jamaica. All I know is everywhere I go for justice in the police force there is someone there trying to kill me or someone there trying to set me up with the police. So I would like the whole world to check this out, listen to this, and know that if I'm dead or anything happens to me, it's the Jamaican police that carry out that work or that order".

== Legacy ==
With Hill having successfully captured film evidence of corruption within the police force, Jamaicans for Justice consider this "a nadir for Jamaica". Hill's case is covered in Aljazeera's programme Island of music and murder.
