= Yves Rocher =

French businessman (1930–2009)

- Born: 7 April 1930; La Gacilly, France
- Died: 26 December 2009 (aged 79); Paris, France
- Years active: 1945–2009
- Known for: cosmetics manufacturing
- Children: Didier Rocher (died 1994)
- Awards: Légion d'honneur (officer, 1992; commander, 2007), Order of the Ermine

Yves Rocher (7 April 1930 – 26 December 2009) was a French businessman and founder of the cosmetics company that bears his name. He was a pioneer of the modern use of natural ingredients in cosmetics.

== Early life ==
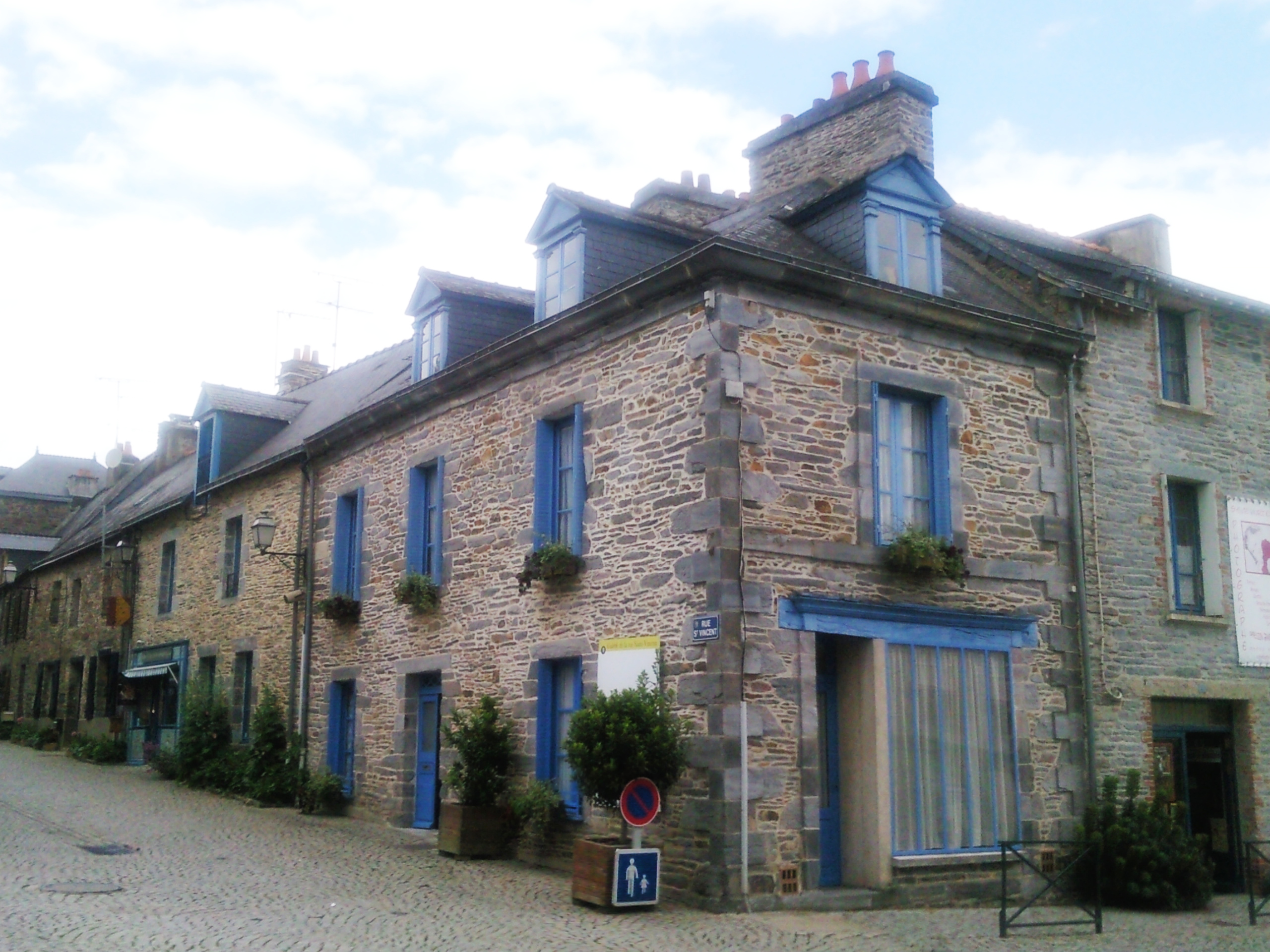
Birthplace of Yves Rocher in La Gacilly.

Yves Rocher was born in the village of La Gacilly, Morbihan, where he grew up. After the death of his father when he was 14, he helped his mother in running the small family textiles business. A local healer gave him the recipe for a hemostatic ointment based on the lesser celandine flower, and he decided to sell the ointment by mail order with adverts in the magazine Ici Paris.

== Business career ==
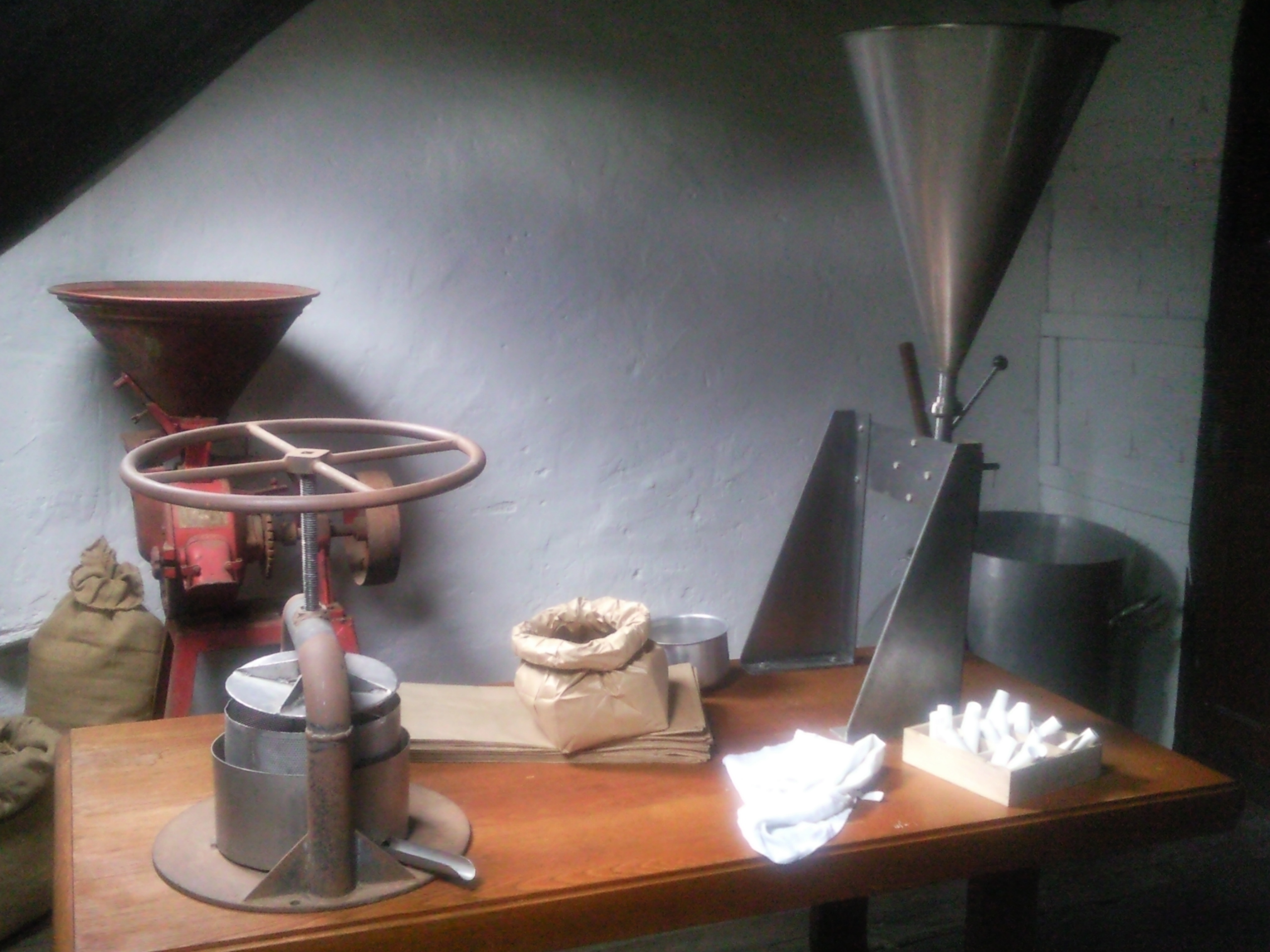
La Gacilly, France, first Yves Rocher laboratory in the family house

Natural products and mail order sales were the pillars of the cosmetics company he founded in 1959. The company expanded rapidly and, three years later, he opened his first shop. Yves Rocher retired from the company in 1992, passing control to his son Didier, but returned to the helm after Didier's death in 1994.

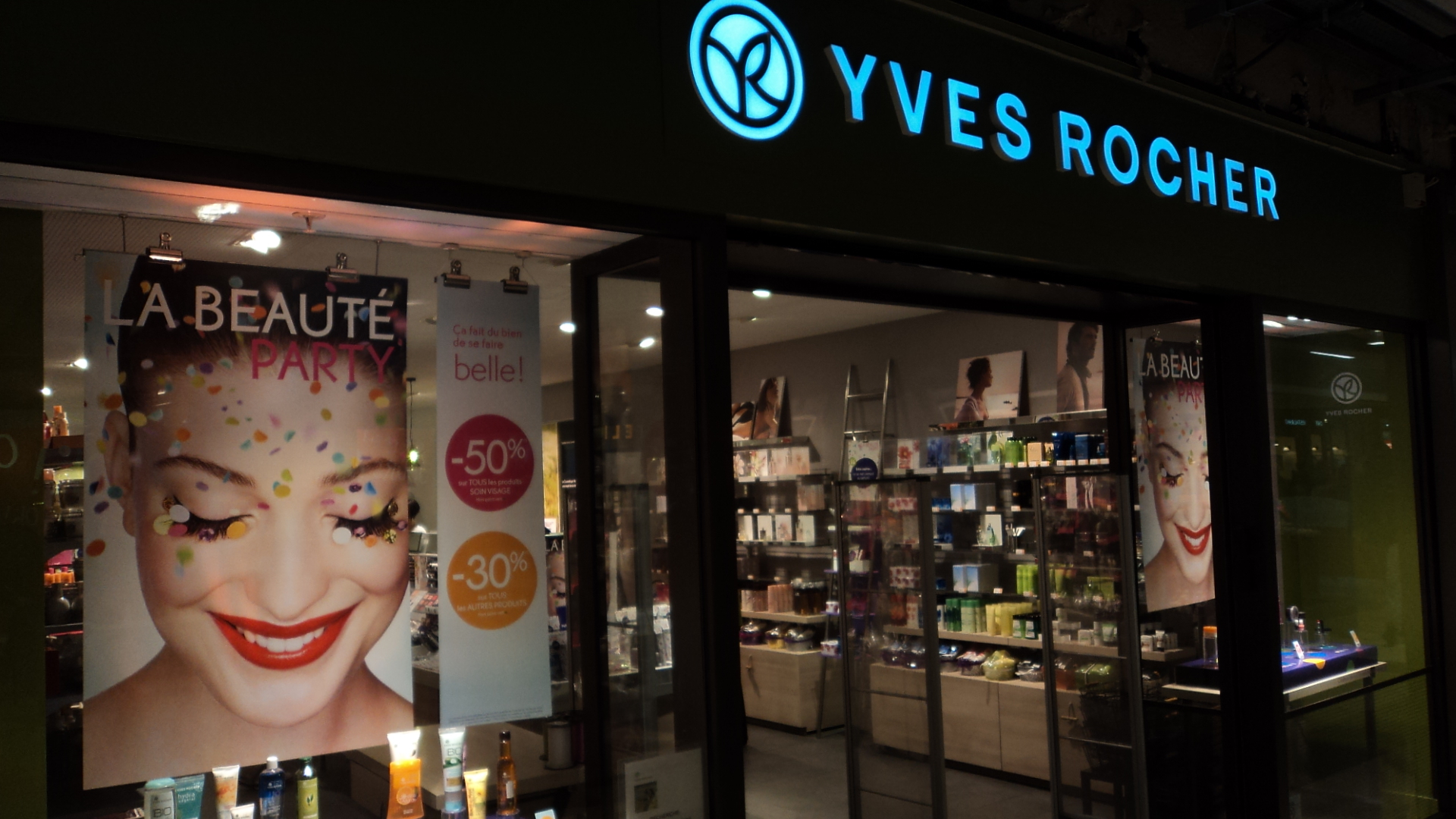
Yves Rocher shop on Italie 2, Paris

His grandson Bris was named vice-president in 2007, and took over the company completely after Yves Rocher's death in 2009. The company had an estimated value of two billion euros in 2007, and employs 15,000 people. The Yves Rocher group achieved a turnover of 2.5 billion euros in 2017.

== Civic activity ==
Yves Rocher was also active on the political scene in southern Brittany. He was mayor of La Gacilly from 1962 to 2008, and was also elected to the General Council of Morbihan in 1982 and the Regional Council of Brittany in 1992.

His company has been instrumental in the economic development of the area around La Gacilly, with factories, development laboratories and a botanical garden. Rocher was sometimes criticised for being the area's main employer as well as its political representative.

== Awards ==
Yves Rocher was made an officer of the Légion d'honneur in 1992 and a commander in April 2007. He was also a member of the Order of the Ermine.

According to the company's website and founder mission, Yves Rocher was opposed to the testing of products on animals, once commenting, "If you have to test your 'products' on animals, you don't know what you're doing."

== Death ==
Yves Rocher died in the Lariboisière Hospital in Paris on 26 December 2009 after suffering a stroke. He was buried in La Gacilly on 30 December in the presence of 5000 people.
