= André Even =

André Even may refer to:

- André Even (basketball)
- André Even (painter)
