= Marne (river) =

Eastern tributary of the river Seine

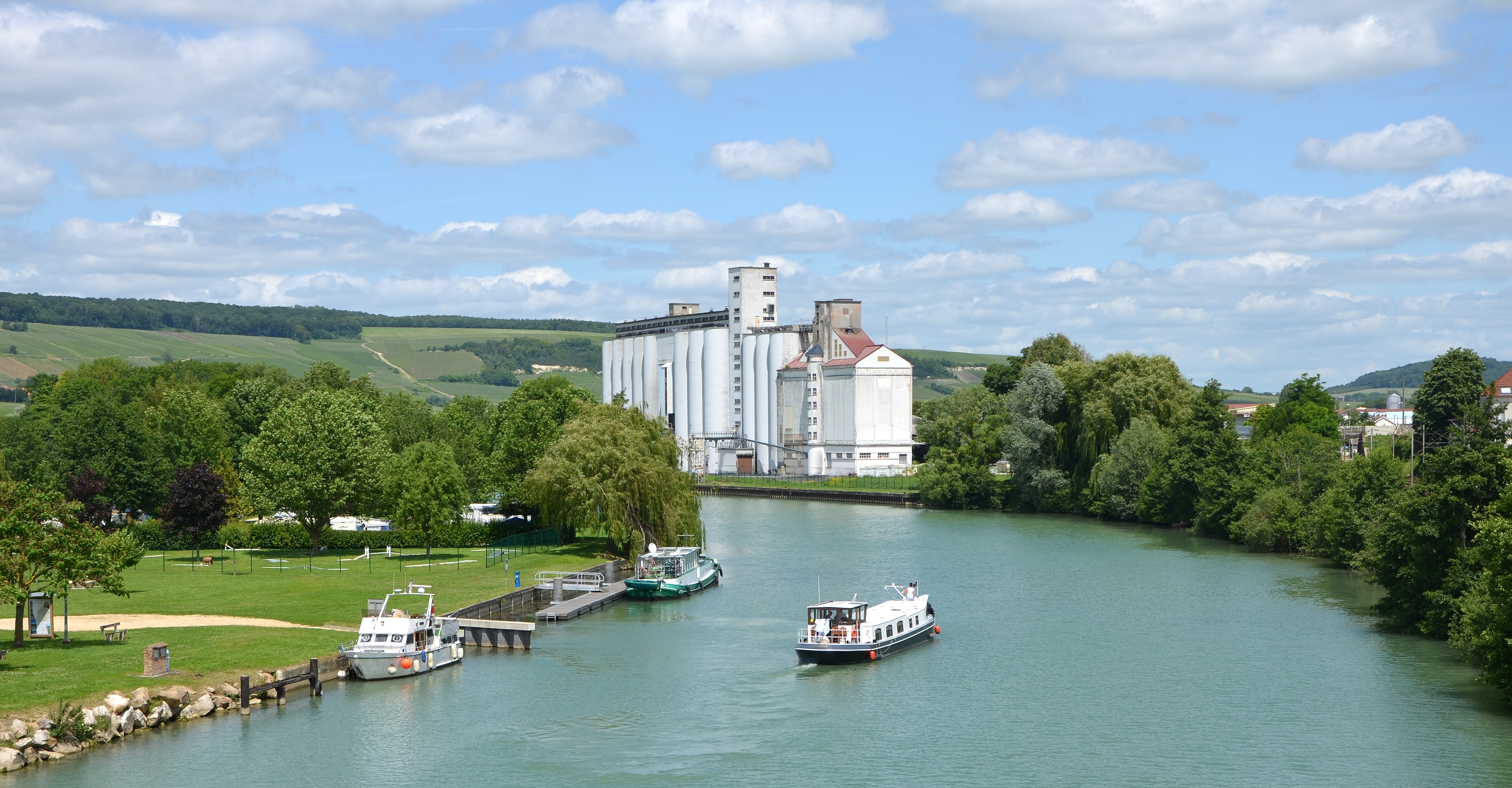
- The Marne at Dormans, showing aspects of 21st century navigation: grain silos, generating traffic, a hotel barge, and recreational craft

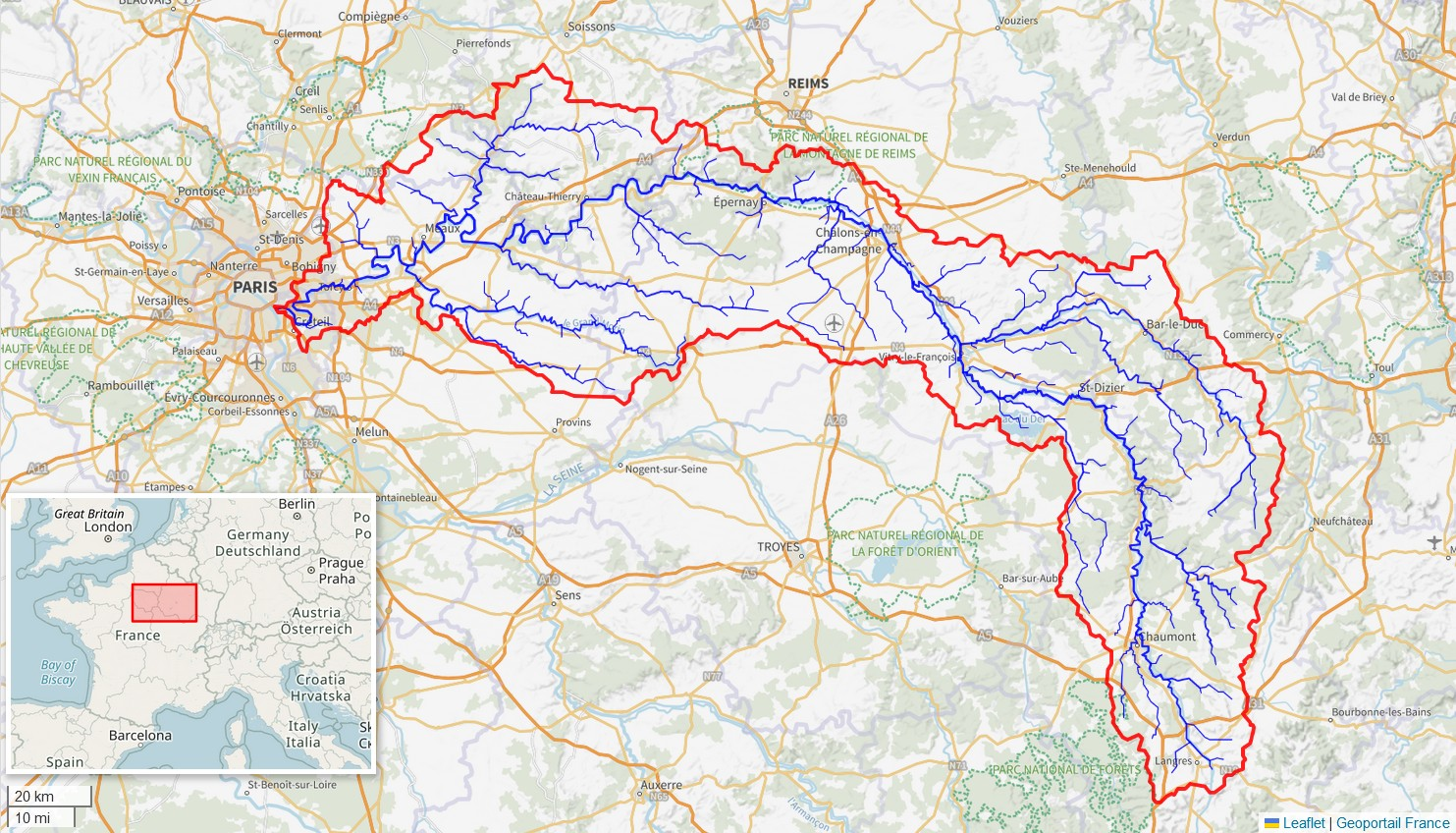
- Marne River Basin (Interactive map)
- Native name: La Marne (French)

Location
- Country: France

Physical characteristics
- Source
  - location: Langres Plateau, Haute-Marne
  - coordinates: 47°49′6″N 5°21′0″E
- Mouth: Seine
  - location: Charenton-le-Pont
  - coordinates: 48°49′0″N 2°24′37″E
- Length: 514 km (319 mi)
- Basin size: 12,800 km^{2} (4,900 mi^{2})
- Discharge
  - average: 100 m^{3}/s (3,500 cu ft/s)

Basin features
- Progression: Seine→ English Channel

The Marne (/mɑːrn/; French pronunciation: [maʁn]) is a river in France, an eastern tributary of the Seine in the area east and southeast of Paris. It is 514 kilometres (319 mi) long. The river gave its name to the departments of Haute-Marne, Marne, Seine-et-Marne, and Val-de-Marne.

The Marne starts in the Langres plateau, runs generally north then bends west between Saint-Dizier and Châlons-en-Champagne, joining the Seine at Charenton just upstream from Paris. Its main tributaries are the Rognon, the Blaise, the Saulx, the Ourcq, the Petit Morin and the Grand Morin.

Near the town of Saint-Dizier, part of the flow is diverted through the artificial Lake Der-Chantecoq. This ensures both flood prevention and the maintenance of minimum river flows in periods of drought.

The Marne is famous as the site of two eponymous battles during World War I. The first battle was a turning point of the war, fought in 1914. The second battle was fought four years later, in 1918.

== History ==
The Gauls worshipped a goddess known as Dea Matrona ("divine mother goddess") who was associated with the Marne.

The Marne was navigable as a free-flowing river until the 19th century. It had one gated 500 m shortcut, the Canal de Cornillon in Meaux, which was built in 1235, the oldest canal in France. Canalisation was started in 1837 and completed to Épernay in 1867. It included a number of canals to bypass the most extravagant meanders.

In World War I, the Marne was the scene of two notable battles. In the First Battle of the Marne (September 1914), the military governor of Paris, General Joseph Gallieni, took the initiative in driving the Germans back from the capital, rendering their war-plan inoperative. In the Second Battle of the Marne (July–August 1918), the last major German offensive on the Western Front was defeated by an Allied counter-attack, leading eventually to the Armistice.

== Navigation ==
During the heyday of canal transportation, the Marne was a major artery connecting Paris and the Seine with major rivers to the east: the Meuse (via the Canal de l'Aisne à la Marne and the Canal des Ardennes), the Moselle and the Rhine (via the Marne-Rhine Canal), and the Saône and Rhône (via the Canal de la Marne à la Saône). To facilitate transportation along the Marne itself, a number of lateral canals were constructed alongside. The most extensive was the Canal latéral à la Marne, which runs 67 km (42 mi) between Vitry-le-François and Dizy. Downstream of this were several more, including the Canal de Meaux à Chalifert, the Canal de Chelles, and the Canal de Saint-Maurice which ended at Charenton-le-Pont near the Marne's confluence with the Seine. Furthermore, a portion of the Canal de l'Ourcq also runs parallel and quite close to the Marne before swinging away to enter Paris from the north; at one time the two were linked by a "tub-boat" inclined plane near Meaux.

== Departments and main towns crossed ==
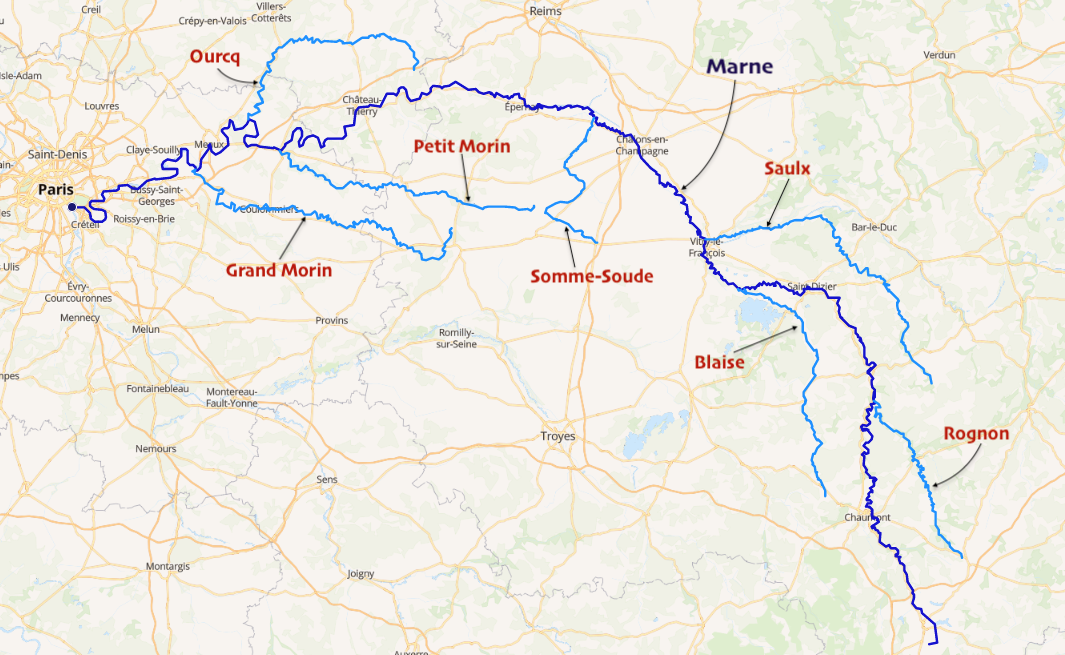
The Marne river and its main tributaries

- Haute-Marne (52): Langres, Chaumont, Saint-Dizier (confluence with the Blaise);
- Marne (51): Vitry-le-François (confluence with the Saulx), Châlons-en-Champagne, Épernay;
- Aisne (02): Château-Thierry;
- Seine-et-Marne (77): Mary (confluence with the Ourcq), Meaux (confluence with the Grand Morin), Précy, Annet (confluence with the Beuvronne), Thorigny, Lagny, Saint-Thibault-des-Vignes, Torcy, Noisiel, Chelles;
- Seine-Saint-Denis (93): Neuilly, Noisy-le-Grand, Gournay, Neuilly-Plaisance;
- Val-de-Marne (94): Alfortville, Nogent, Créteil, Charenton-le-Pont, Champigny, Saint-Maur-des-Fossés, Joinville-le-Pont, Saint-Maurice, Bry, Le Perreux.

== Artistic depictions ==
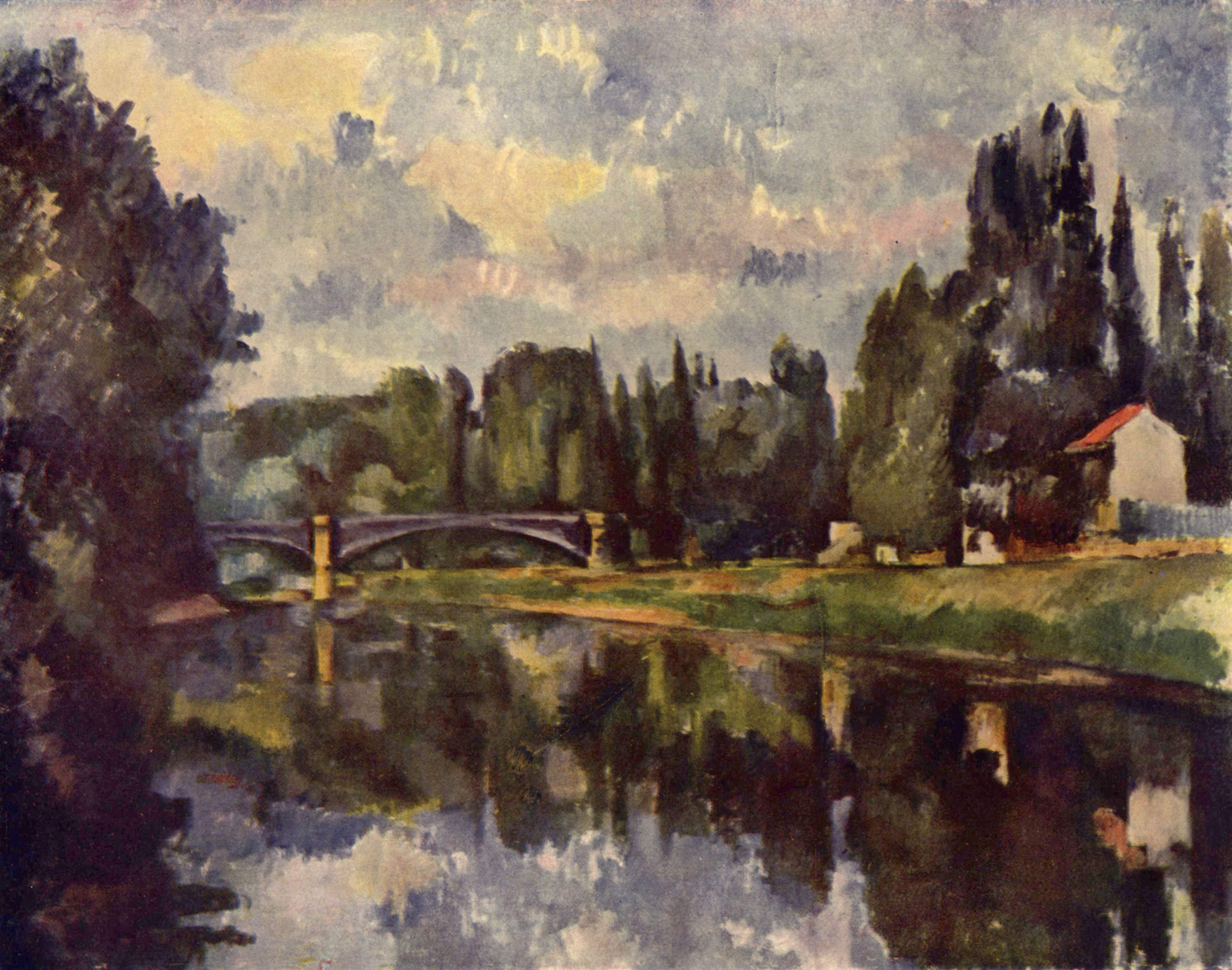
Les Bords de la Marne, 1888 by Paul Cézanne

During the 19th and 20th centuries the Marne inspired many painters, among whom were:

- Camille Corot;
- Paul Cézanne;
- Pierre Emmanuel Damoye;
- Camille Pissarro;
- Henri Rousseau, known as "Le Douanier Rousseau";
- Albert Marquet;
- Raoul Dufy;
- André Dunoyer de Ségonzac;
- Louis Vuillermoz;
- Maurice Boitel;
- Daniel du Janerand.
