= Windmill at Zaandam =

1871 painting by Claude Monet

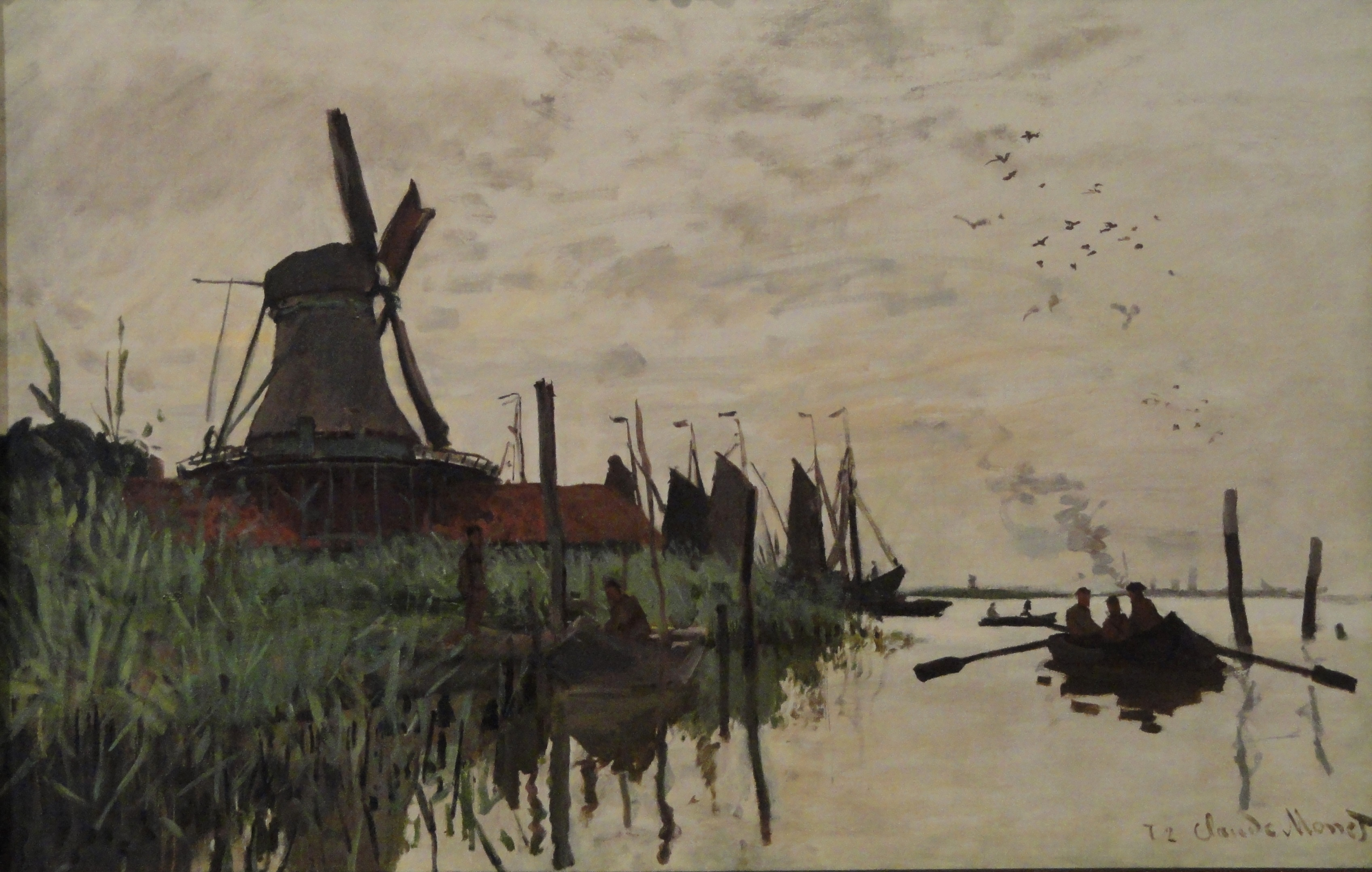

Windmill at Zaandam or Windmill and Boat at Zaandam is an 1871 oil painting by Claude Monet. Since 1986 it has been in the Ny Carlsberg Glyptotek.

Claude Monet and his family fled to London to avoid the Franco-Prussian War. At its end, he returned to France, but took a detour via Zaandam in the Netherlands on the recommendation of Charles-François Daubigny, spending five months there and producing about 20 paintings of the flat landscape thereabouts.

== See also ==
- List of paintings by Claude Monet
