= Hippolyte Camille Delpy =

French painter

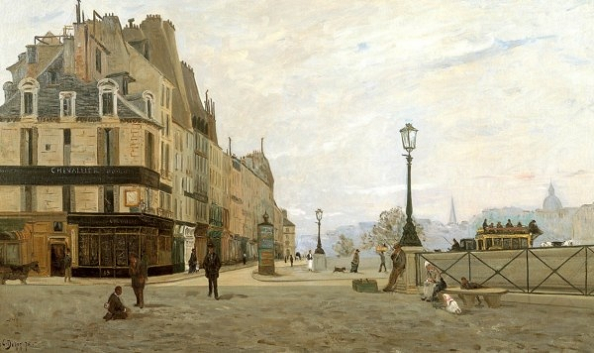
The Pont Neuf and the Quai des Orfèvres

Hippolyte Camille Delpy (1842–1910) was a French painter.

He came from a moderately wealthy family from Joigny, in the Burgundy region of France. His son, Henry Jacques Delpy (1877–1957), also became a painter, as did a cousin on his father's side, Lucien-Victor Delpy (1898–1967).

Delpy studied with Charles-François Daubigny as well as Corot. A contemporary of the Impressionists, Delpy blended the subject matter that he adopted from Daubigny with the brighter colors and looser paint handling that were trademarks of his own generation to create distinctive new visions of many of the landscapes first explored by the Barbizon artists.

Delpy became interested in painting when he met Daubigny around 1855, and in 1858 Daubigny took on Delpy as an informal student. During the summers, Delpy (who was close in age to Daubigny's own son, Karl, also a painter) traveled with Daubigny on excursions aboard the studio-boat "Le Botin". Through Daubigny, Delpy met Corot, who encouraged and occasionally advised the young painter. In 1869, Delpy sent his first paintings to the Salon; in December he began to paint small snow scenes, as Pissarro and Monet were also doing during that remarkable winter.

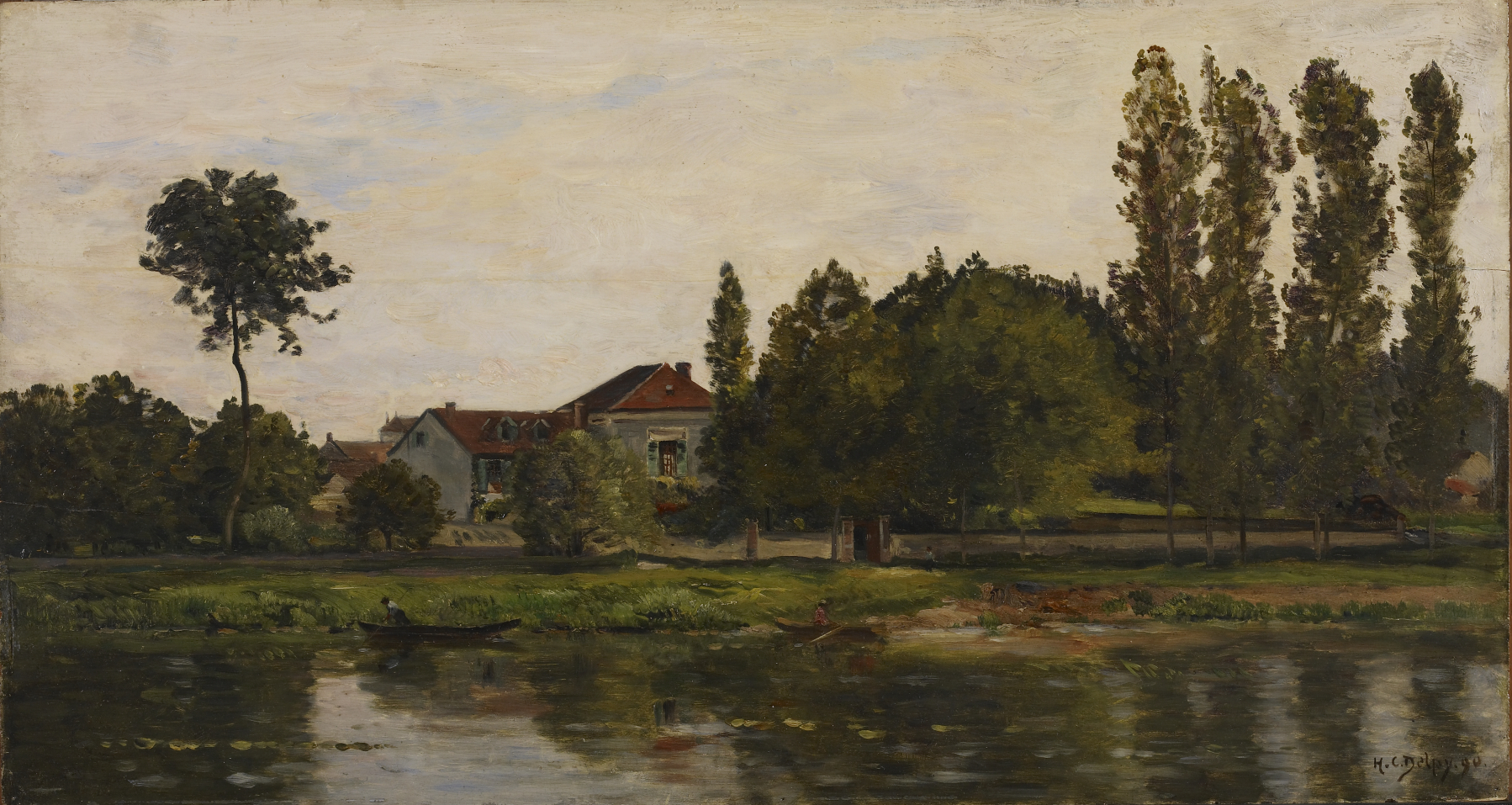
The House of Mr Lucas

In the early 1870s, Delpy worked often in Ville-d'Avray, Corot's favored country site, and in Auvers-sur-Oise where Daubigny lived. Delpy began friendships with Pissarro and Cézanne who shared his admiration of Daubigny.

His Salon paintings of 1873 and 1874 were well received. In 1875, exhibited a snow scene at the Salon for the first time and was complemented by the critic Jules-Antoine Castagnary for his originality.

In 1876 Delpy organized a sale of his own paintings at the auction house Hôtel Drouot, an unusual undertaking. The sale was favorably announced in several newspapers and was a significant success, with all 45 works sold. That summer, Delpy moved his family to Bois-le-Roi, outside the Forest of Fontainebleau.

At the Salon of 1880, Delpy exhibited a potato harvesting scene, his first landscape with large-scale figures. Throughout the 1880s, Delpy alternated work on the Normandy coast with stays in the Forest of Fontainebleau and in Paris. Delpy received his first Salon medal in 1884.

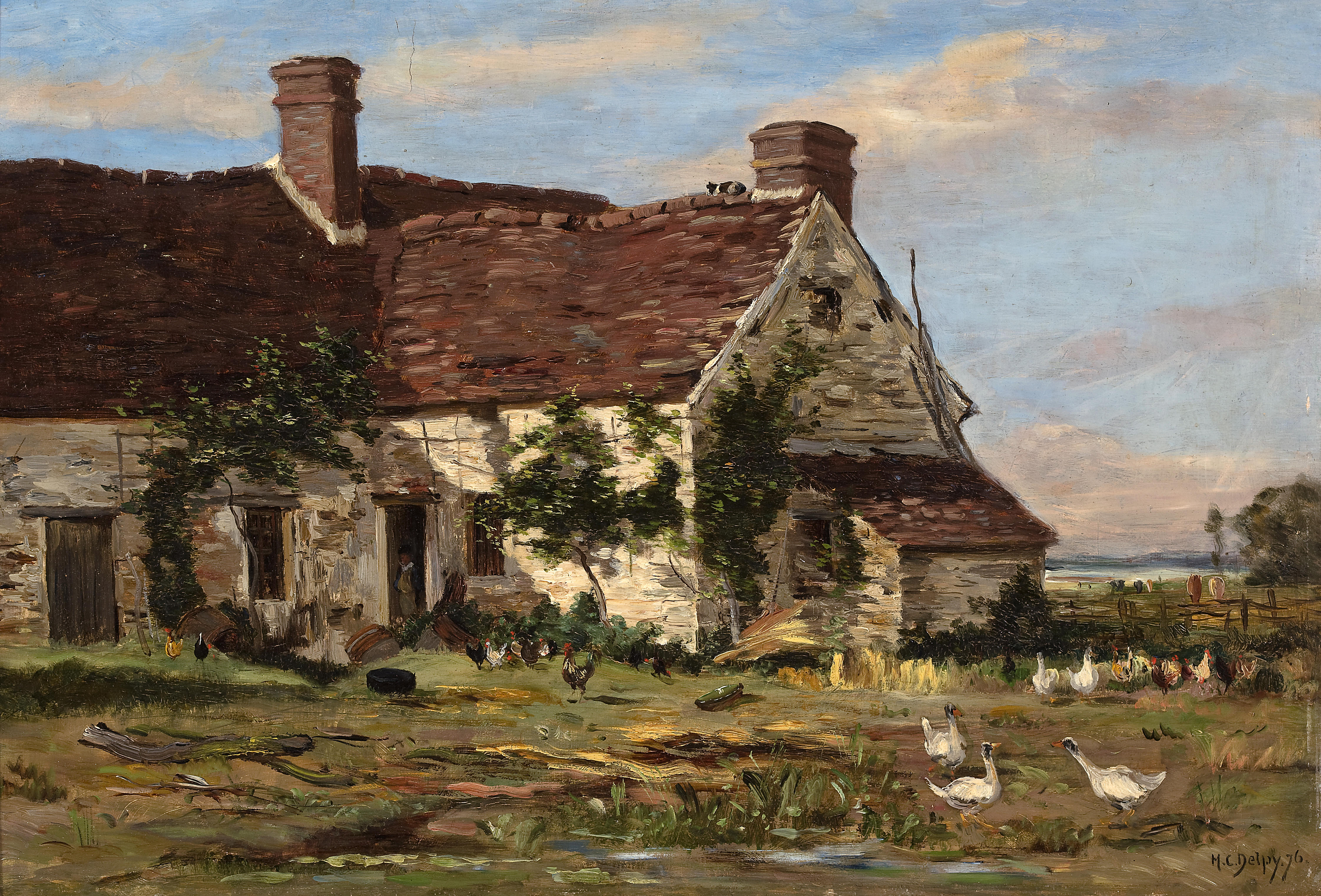
Farm near the Bois le Roi

In 1886, Delpy traveled to the United States as part of a team that painted a panorama of the battle of Manassas (American Civil War) in Washington DC. At the Exposition Universelle of 1889, Delpy was awarded an honorable mention.

The Galerie Georges Petit, a leading dealer in contemporary French paintings, began to handle his work and subsequently organized several one-man exhibitions of Delpy's paintings. Petit was simultaneously promoting Pissarro and Alfred Sisley and would later show Monet. In 1908, Delpy was given an exhibition at the prestigious Grafton Galleries in London. Today his works are in a large number of public and private collections, including The Walters Art Museum in Baltimore, the Tokyo Fuji Art Museum, and the Musée Carnavalet, Paris.

Delpy died in 1910.
