= André Even (painter) =

French painter

André Even (May 16, 1918, Pont-Aven, France – March 14, 1997) was a French painter.

== Biography ==
=== Education ===
A few years after his commitment to the aeronaval in Rochefort, Even was deployed for the beginning of WWII. Following the demobilization, he joined several religious communities until Monseigneur Lefèbre from Mortain, who is genuinely amazed by his work, convinces him to pursue his artistic vocation. Thus, André Even began his studies at the National School of Fine Arts in Paris and worked alongside Maurice Denis in his workshop. While in Paris, he accepted a number of commissions from cathedrals and churches destroyed due to the international conflict.

=== The return in Brittany ===
By 1950, the painter returned to Brittany for a few years. There, he worked on religious commissions, before going back to Paris and focused on more profane subjects such as the urban landscape of Paris and the rural landscape of his childhood in Pont Aven. Twenty years later, he finally settled down in a little Briton village and continued to accept commissions.

Influenced by Paul Cézanne, Vincent van Gogh and Charles-François Daubigny, André Even’s body of work is filled with synthetic landscapes. Briton houses, cultivated and uncultivated fields are components of his canvases that are strictly guided by the golden number, which brings harmony to the entire work. His style can be situated between primitive and contemporary Italian painting. The artist worked repetitively on similar subjects, while altering the hues to create a renewed pictorial experience. Another characteristic of his work is the home-made paint, which is composed of wax and pigments.

== Paintings ==
=== Religious paintings ===
- The Pieta, Izart gallery of Pont-Aven, wax painting, 35x24 cm
- The Crucifixion, Nevez's Church, 1950, 60 m^{2}
- The life of Mary, the Nativity and the Entombment, Church of Holy Heart of Mary of Concarneau, 1951, 300 m^{2}
- The appearance of Saint Michael Joan of Arc, Jeanne d'Arc Church Lorient
- The Green Christ, Pont-Aven Church, 1958

=== Landscapes ===
- Port in Brittany, Izart gallery, oil paints, 61x46 cm
- Boat in Concarneau, Izart gallery, oil paints, 41x33 cm
- Pink Field, Izart gallery, wax painting, 61x46 cm
- Boats at Doelan, Izart gallery, wax painting, 73x54 cm
- Rape fields, Izart gallery, wax painting, 72x54 cm
- Two houses, Izart gallery, oil paints, 92x73cm
- Viaduct of Pont-Aven, Izart gallery, wax painting, 55x38 cm
- Town in Brittany, Izart gallery, oil paints, 73x60 cm
- The green valley, Izart gallery, wax painting, 35x24 cm
- Golden fields, Izart gallery, wax painting, 35x24 cm

=== Still life ===
- Still Life, Izart gallery, wax painting, 46x61cm
- Still Life, Izart gallery, oil paints, 55x38cm
- Still Life with Apples, Izart gallery, wax painting, 35x24 cm

== Exhibitions and collections ==
=== Special exhibition ===
- Presidial of Quimperlé from 1 July to 31 August 1996
- Vanhove Gallery in Quimper from 18 May to 9 June 1984
- Group exhibition at the Drouant Gallery in Paris in 1979 on the occasion of the fiftieth anniversary of the magazine " The Caduceus "
- Paul Vallotton Gallery in Lausanne in Switzerland
- Group exhibition in Osaka in Japan in 1994

=== Permanent exhibition ===
Most André Even paintings are preserved to IZART Gallery Pont-Aven (13 rue du Port, 29000 Pont-Aven 02 98 06 43 92) as part of a permanent exhibition on the painter.

=== Collection ===
Some paintings by André Even were purchased by the state and the city of Paris and is part of many private collections in France and abroad : Pont- Aven Museum, Museum of Modern Art in Paris, Museum Vatican, Cantini Museum Marseille and Maison de Radio- France.

== Bibliography ==
- Christian Dautel, André Even: A painter born in Pont-Aven, Municipal Bulletin Q3, 1996
- Roger Bouillot, Jacques Marzin, Pierre Osenat, André Even Pont-Aven, printed on presses SCBL Montrouge

== See also ==
- Pont-Aven
- Paul Cézanne
- Vincent van Gogh
- Charles-François Daubigny
