= Karl Pierre Daubigny =

French artist (1846-1886)

Karl Pierre Daubigny (1846–1886) was a French artist, known for his landscape paintings.

== Biography ==
Karl Pierre Daubigny was the son of Charles François Daubigny and much influenced by him. He made his debut, at the age of 17, at the Salon of 1863 with Un Sentier (A Track) and Île de Vaux in Auvers, which showed his keen feel for nature in spring. He continued to exhibit regularly at the Salon. In the Salon of 1866 he showed Vue Prise en Picardie (View Taken in Picardy) and Halte de Bohémiens (Halt of Bohemians). He was awarded medals in the Salon of 1868 and Salon of 1874. Karl Pierre Daubigny figured in the exhibition De Delacroix à Dufy, Falaises et Rochers at the Musée des Terre-Neuvas in Fécamp in 1998. In 2000 an exhibition featuring the works of both father and son for the first time was organized at the Musée Daubigny in Auvers-sur-Oise”

His earliest works are obviously influenced by his father, but he soon came to develop a more personal and sombre style (the works of his maturity achieved a very personal and original style, characterized above all by the atmosphere and the plays of color and light, perfectly realized with pure colors). The forest of Fontainebleau or the coastline and landscape of Brittany and Normandy provided most of his subjects (e.g. the Return of the Fishing Fleet to Trouville, 1872; Musée Granet, Aix-en-Provence, and the Banks of the Seine, 1880; Musée Municipal, Brest). He also produced a number of landscape etchings, including several after his father's paintings, two of which appeared in Frédéric Henriet's C. Daubigny et son oeuvre gravé (Paris, 1875)

Karl Daubigny died prematurely at the age of 40. His prolific contribution to the second generation of Barbizon painters is evident in his ability to convey, through his painting, his devotion to and love of nature.

== Gallery ==
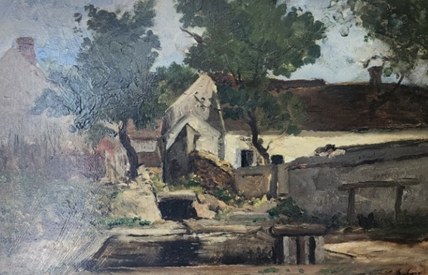
"Paysage de Ferme" Karl Pierre Daubigny

"Paysage de Ferme" (A Farm Scene) A Barbizon school rural scene,. A farm setting with buildings, trees, and a water feature. Impressionistic, characterized by soft brushstrokes and a focus on light and atmosphere.

== Selected Museum Collections ==
The work of Karl Pierre Daubigny can be found at the following museums and galleries:

- Bristol Museum and Art Gallery, Bristol
- Château-Musée de Dieppe, Dieppe
- Culzean Castle, Maybole
- Musée d’Orsay, Paris
- Musée Daubigny, Auvers-sur-Oise
- Musée de Grenoble, Grenoble
- Musée des Beaux-Arts, Blois
- Musée des Beaux-Arts, Brest
- Musée des Beaux-Arts, Pau
- Musée Thomas-Henry, Cherbourg-Octeville
- Rijksmuseum, The Hague
