= Pool Beneath Trees =

Painting by Charles-François Daubigny

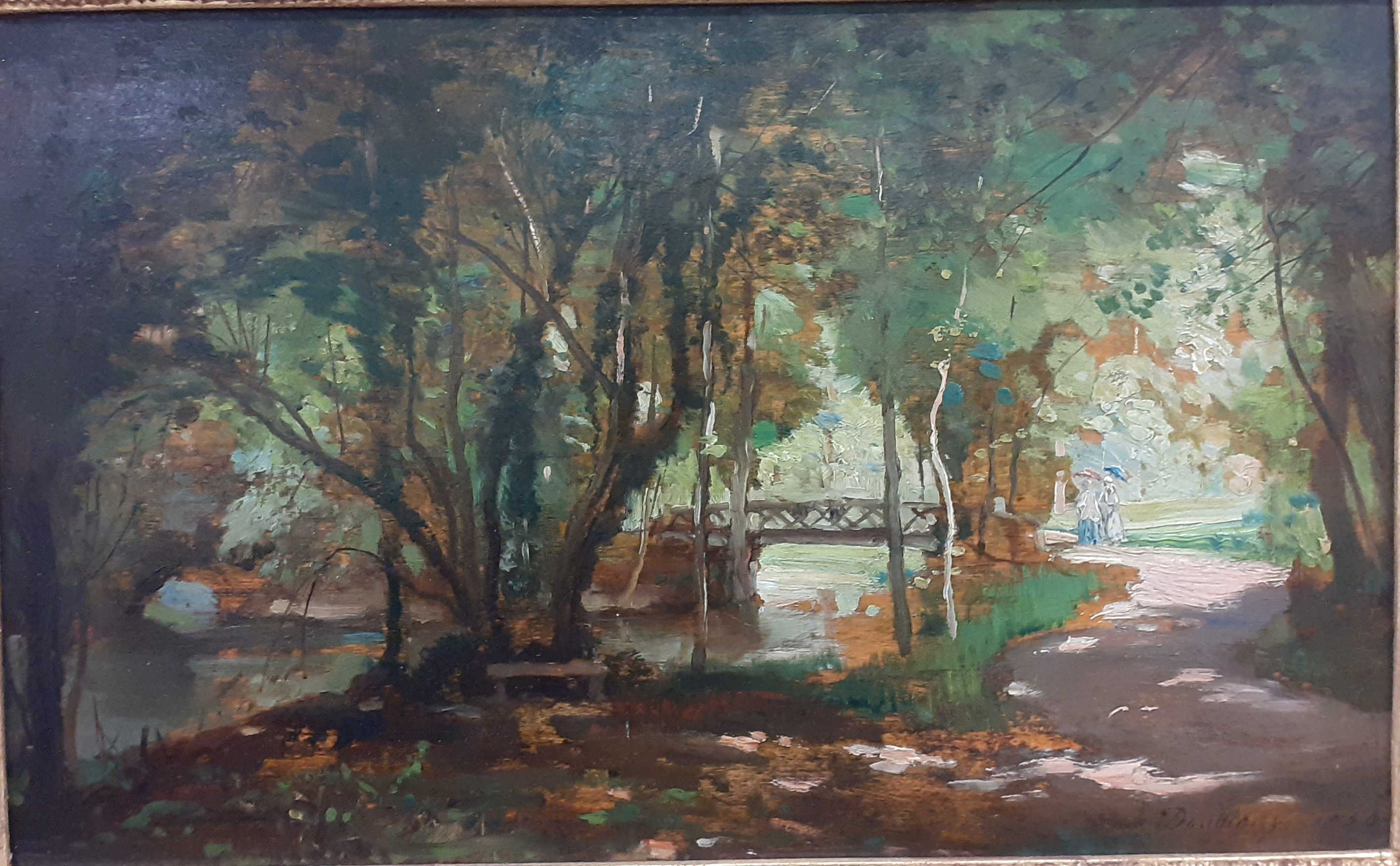
- Artist: Charles-François Daubigny
- Year: 1850
- Medium: Oil on canvas
- Dimensions: 19.5 cm × 32 cm (7.7 in × 13 in)
- Location: Museum of Modern Art André Malraux - MuMa; Le Havre

Pool Beneath Trees is an oil on canvas painting by the French painter Charles-François Daubigny in 1850. It is held at the Museum of Modern Art André Malraux - MuMa, in Le Havre. The signature of the painter and the date 1850 are seen at the bottom right.

== Description ==
This small oil painting depicts two women, barely seen, carrying parasols, at the center right, in a leafy undergrowth, walking in a shaft of sunlight, heading toward a footbridge. The painting is very sketchy and shadowy, with most of its space occupied by the foliage of the trees. Its unfinished appearance seems to anticipate what would be impressionism.

== Provenance ==
The painting, bequeathed by Charles-Auguste Marande in 1936 to the city of Le Havre, is now held there at the Museum of modern art André Malraux - MuMa.
