= Pierre Emmanuel Damoye =

French painter

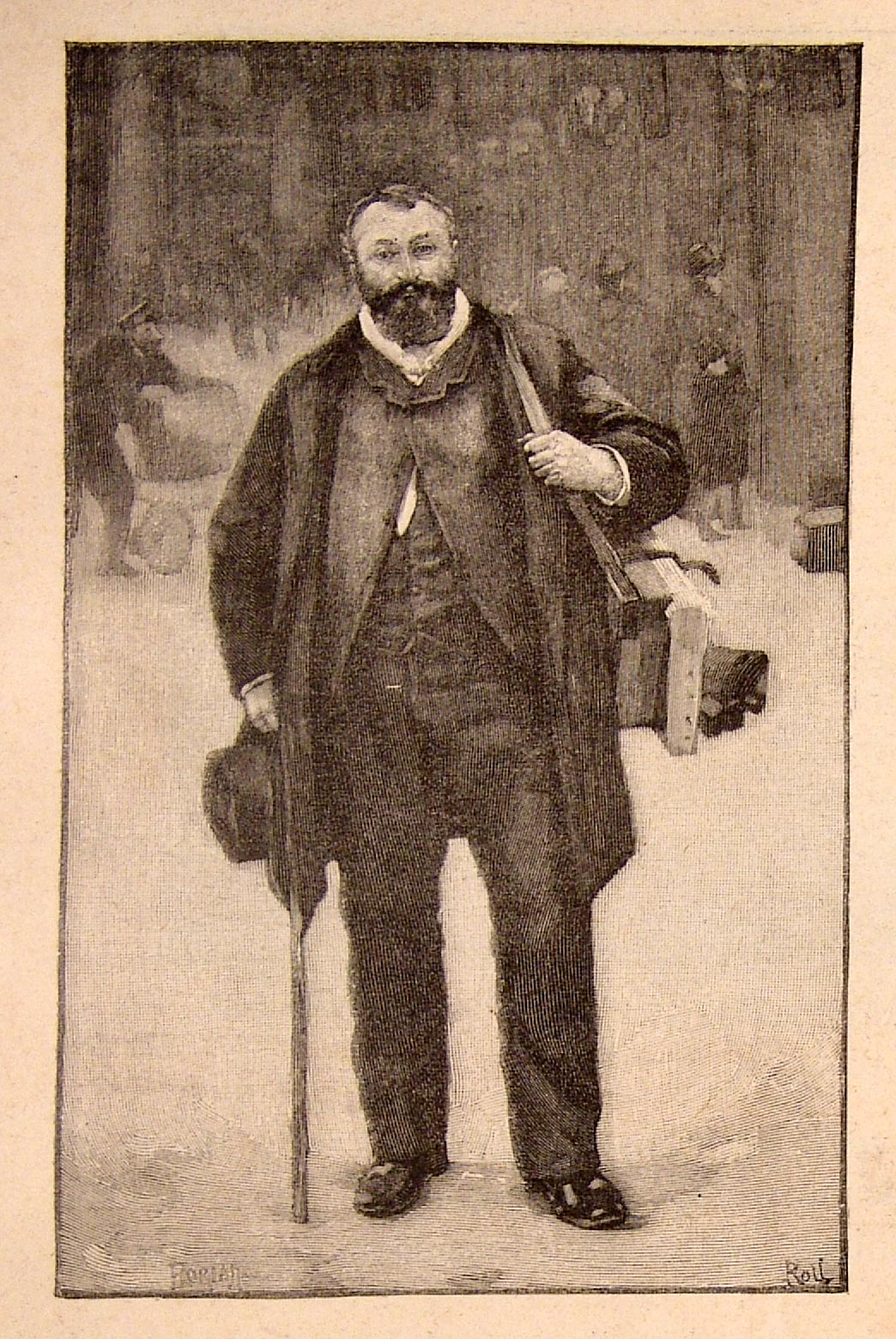
- Damoye in 1889
- Born: 20 February 1847; Paris, France
- Died: 23 January 1916 (aged 68); Paris, France
- Education: École des Beaux-Arts
- Known for: Landscape art, Painting
- Movement: Barbizon School
- Awards: Gold Medal Exposition Universelle (1889); Légion d'honneur in 1893

Pierre Emmanuel Damoye (20 February 1847 – 23 January 1916) was a French artist who was regularly recognized by a broad range of art critics as one of the most significant heirs to the Barbizon school tradition. He studied his craft at the École des Beaux-Arts and went on to become a renowned and influential landscape artist noted for his sweeping skies, tree studded-plains, and vibrant farmlands.

== Teachers & Influences ==
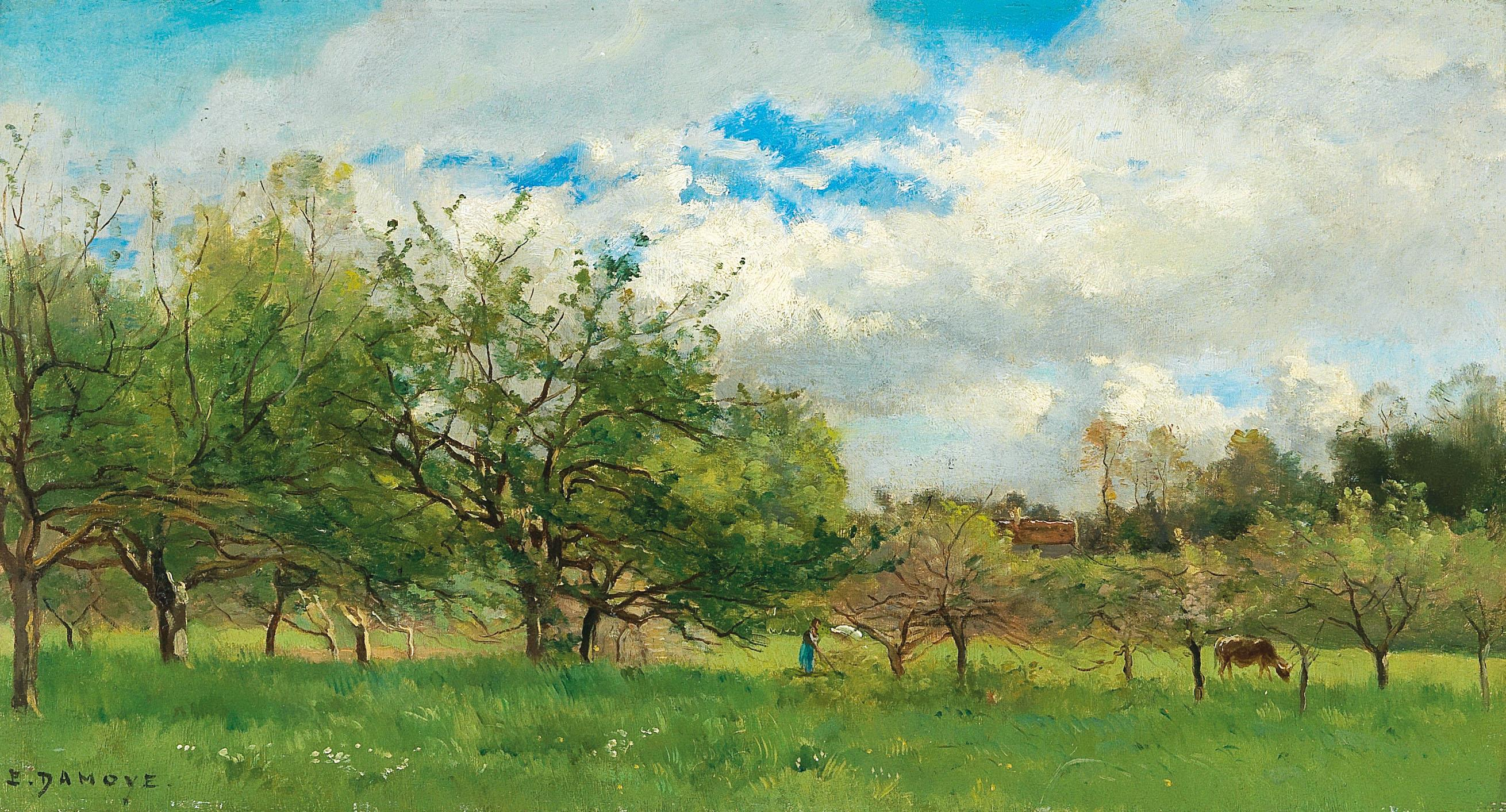
Landscape in Summer (oil on panel)

Damoye studied at the École des Beaux-Arts in the studio of Léon Bonnat, one of the foremost figure painters and portraitists of the late nineteenth-century. Damoye, however, seems to have committed himself to landscape art from the beginning of his career. His earliest dated works from the late 1860s also clearly reveal the influence of both Jean-Baptiste-Camille Corot and Charles-François Daubigny, from whom he acquired both a brighter range of colors and a looser, more ‘impressionist’ brush style. And, although he was cognizant of the example of Corot and Daubigny, he built his repertoire of compositions and favored sites quite independently of the two ‘old masters’ of river landscape, thus developing a very personalized color scheme.

He is also one of the principal artists associated with the ‘school of Pontoise’, a group of young landscapists who painted primarily along the riverbanks of the Seine and Oise Rivers, north of Paris, often establishing homes in Pontoise. He also painted the river banks and upland plateaus of the Oise and Seine basins, worked frequently in Picardy and throughout the great Loire valley. He also made at least one trip to the Normandy coast.

== Exhibitions & Recognition ==
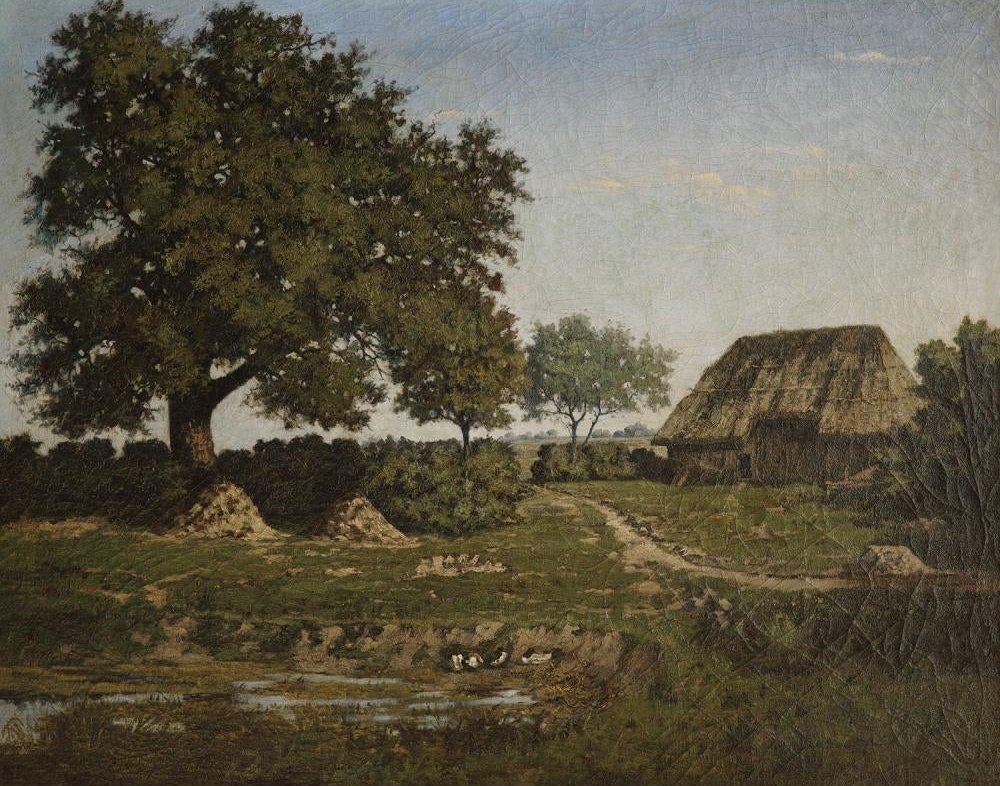
Landscape with Thatched Cottage

Damoye began to exhibit at the Salon of 1875 with a landscape titled L’hiver, and by 1879 he had won his first medal, a bronze or third class honor, beginning an unusually rapid rise for a landscape painter. In 1884 he received a second class medal, followed by a very prestigious gold medal at the grand, centennial Exposition Universelle (1889). He was inducted into the Légion d'honneur in 1893 and became a member of the Salon jury in 1900. Despite such official recognition, however, Damoye was instrumental in forming the break-away Société Nationale des Beaux-Arts, a rival exhibition association, and he continued to be associated with the ‘Salon du Champ-de-Mars’ until his death in 1916.

== Death and legacy ==
Pierre Emmanuel Damoye died in 1916 and is buried in Père Lachaise Cemetery in Paris.

Damoye's works can be seen in the Musée du Louvre, Paris; Musée d'Orsay, Paris; Musée des Beaux-Arts, Bordeaux; Musée des Beaux-Arts, Troyes, France; and the National Museum of Art, Bucharest, Romania; Ateneum Art Museum, Helsinki. Auction results to 2010 include sales at Christie's (New York, $30,000), Osenat (Paris, $11,470), Sotheby's (New York, $10,800), and Beaussant Lefevre (Paris, $10,230).
