= Charles-François Daubigny =

French painter (1817–1878)

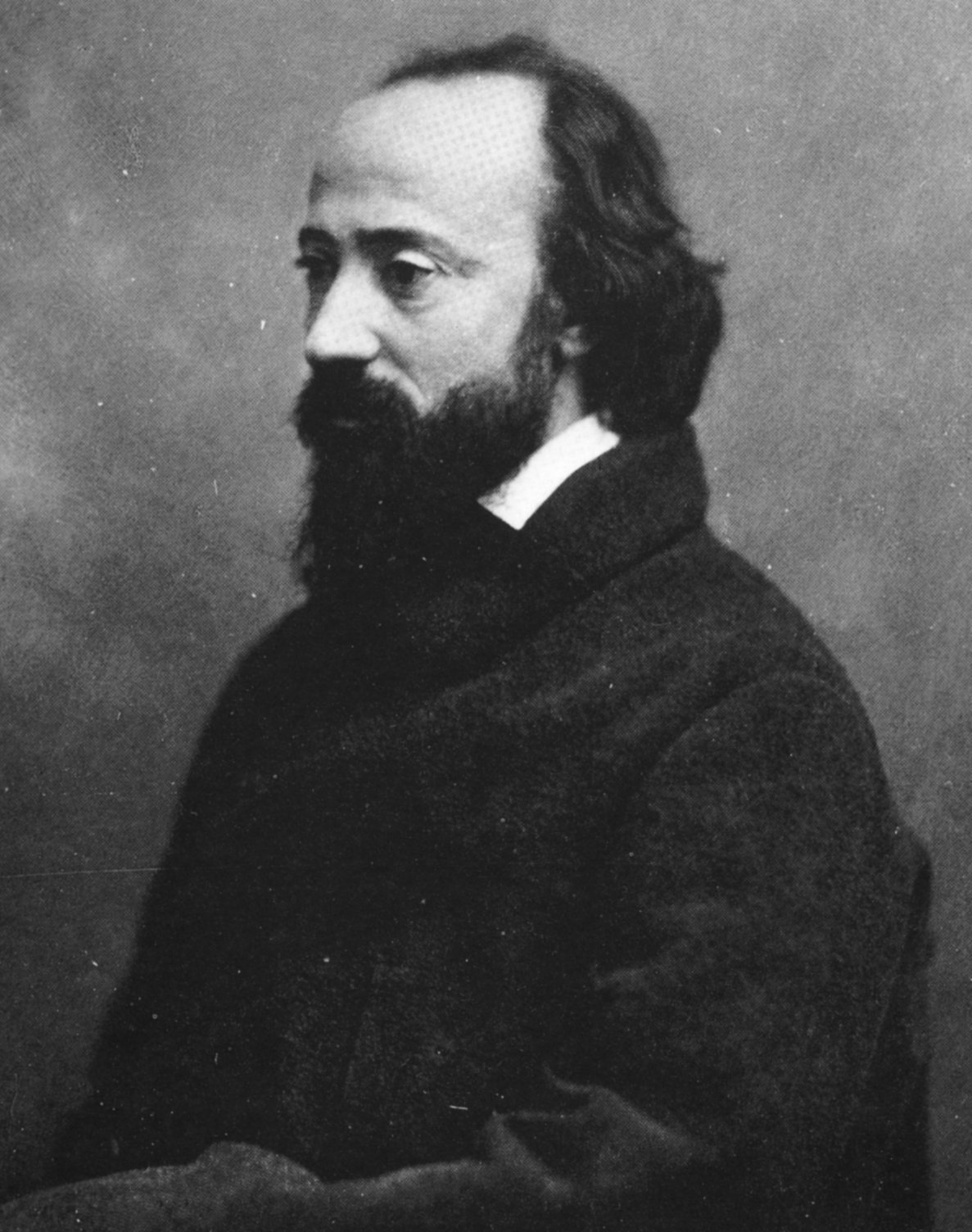
- Photograph by Nadar
- Born: 15 February 1817; Paris, France
- Died: 19 February 1878 (aged 61); Paris, France
- Known for: Painting
- Movement: Barbizon school

Charles-François Daubigny (/ˈdoʊbɪnji/ DOH-bin-yee, US: /ˌdoʊbiːnˈjiː, doʊˈbiːnji/ DOH-been-YEE, doh-BEEN-yee, French: [ʃaʁl fʁɑ̃swa dobiɲi]; 15 February 1817 – 19 February 1878) was a French painter, one of the members of the Barbizon school, and is considered an important precursor of impressionism.

He was also a prolific printmaker, mostly in etching, and one of the main artists who used the cliché verre technique.

== Biography ==
Daubigny was born in Paris, into a family of painters; taught art by his father, Edmé-François Daubigny, and his uncle, miniaturist Pierre Daubigny (1793–1858). He was also a pupil of Jean-Victor Bertin, Jacques Raymond Brascassat and Paul Delaroche, from whom he would quickly emancipate himself. Though best known for his painted landscapes, Daubigny survived for many years as a graphic artist, illustrating books, magazines and travel guides for publication.

In 1838, he set up, at the Rue des Amandiers-Popincourt, a community of artists, a phalanstery, with Adolphe-Victor Geoffroy-Dechaume, Hippolyte Lavoignat, Ernest Meissonnier, Auguste Steinheil, Louis Joseph Trimolet, with whom he already had expressed his interest in subjects drawn directly from daily life and nature. These artists will work, among others, for the publisher Léon Curmer, who was specialized in books illustrated with vignettes. From this period date the first confirmed engravings by Daubigny.

Initially Daubigny painted in a more traditional style, but this changed after 1843 when he settled in Barbizon to work outside in nature. Even more important was his meeting with Camille Corot in 1852 in Optevoz (Isère). From 1852 onward, he was influenced by Gustave Courbet. The two artists were from the same generation and were driven by the realist movement: during a joint stay, each composed a series of views of Optevoz.

In 1848, Daubigny worked on behalf of the Chalcographie du Louvre, performing facsimiles, which testifies to his great expertise in this art, and revisiting the technique of aquatint in a less cumbersome process. His famous series of Rolling Carts dates from this period.

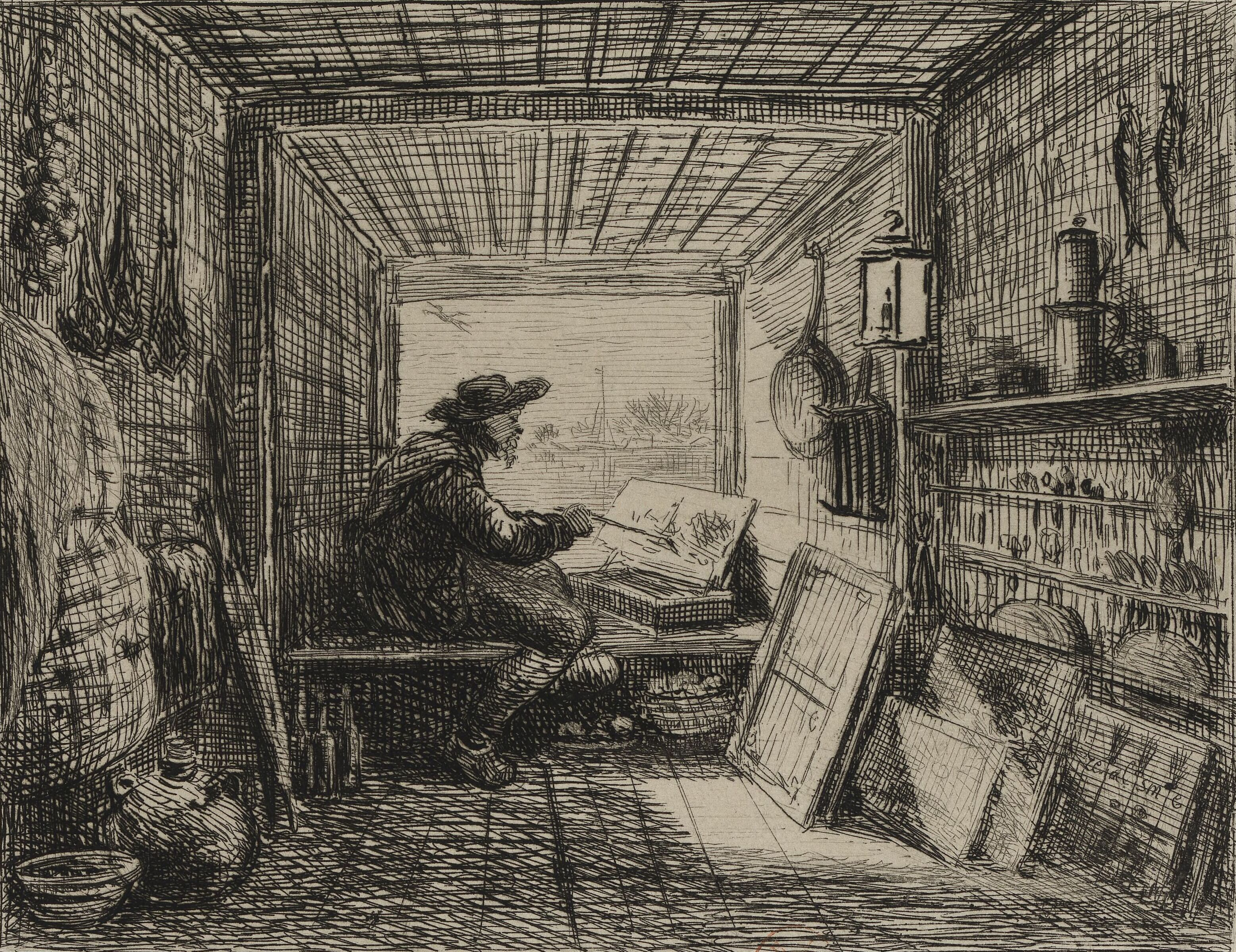
Self-portrait of Daubigny painting in his floating studio, from Voyage en Bateau.

In 1857, Daubigny bought a boat and outfitted it as a floating studio, taking his first excursion in November of that year. As "captain" of the Botin, he painted along the Seine and Oise, often in the region around Auvers. In 1862, Daubigny published Voyage en Bateau, a series of 19 etchings (including the title page) depicting the artist's life on and along the water in his floating atelier, accompanied by a "cabin boy," his son Karl. "This was a practice that greatly inspired Claude Monet, who followed Daubigny and made his own studio boat."

In 1862, with Corot, he experimented with the cliché-verre technique, a process halfway between photography and printmaking.

In 1866, he joined the jury of the Paris Salon for the first time, alongside his friend Corot. The same year, Daubigny visited England, eventually returning because of the Franco-Prussian War, in 1870. In London he met Claude Monet, and they left for the Netherlands together. Back in Auvers, he was visited by an admiring Paul Cézanne.

Daubigny died in Paris in 1878. His remains are interred at cimetière du Père-Lachaise (division 24).

== Legacy ==
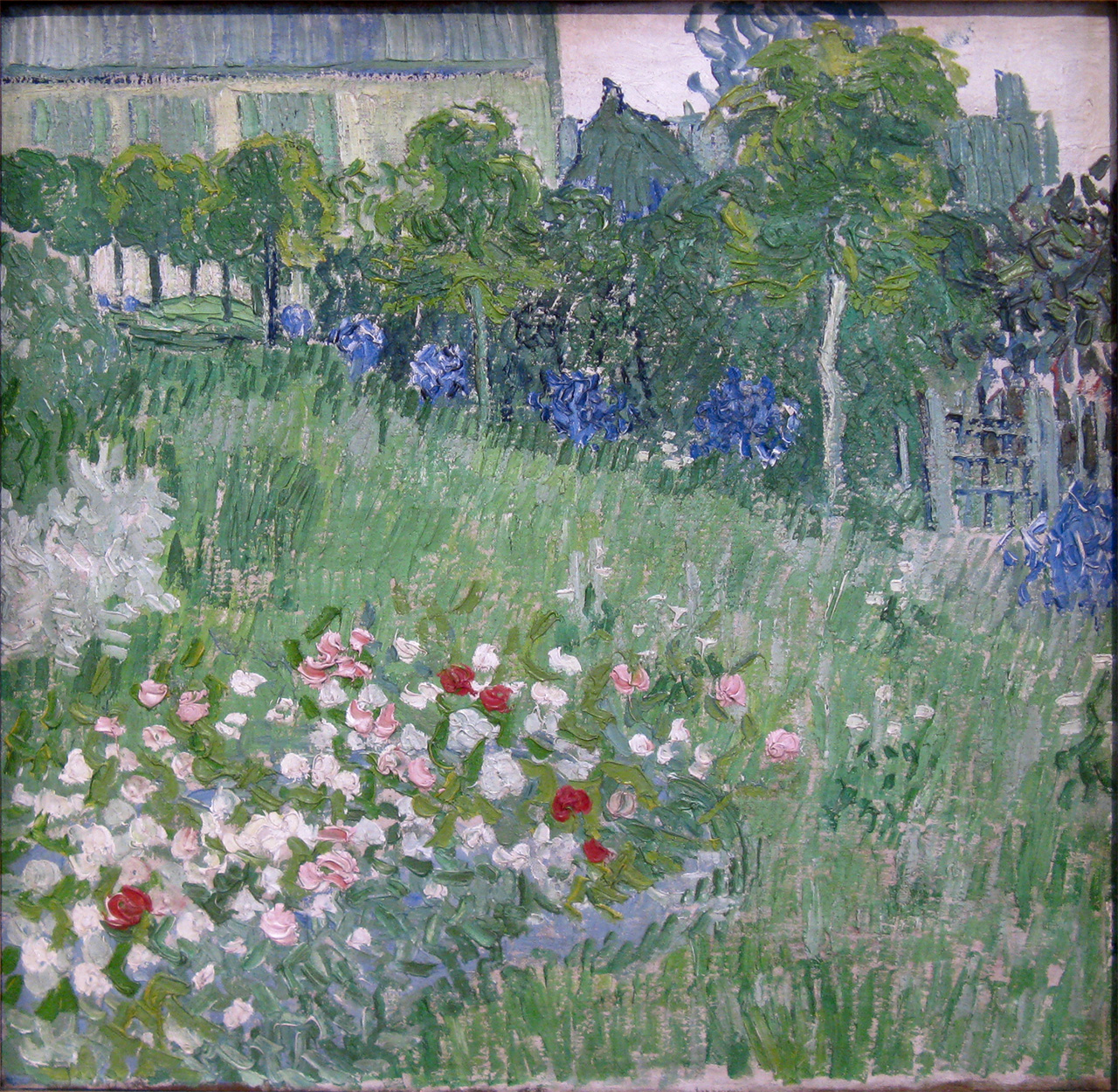
Daubigny's Garden, painted by Vincent van Gogh in 1890.

His followers and pupils included his son Karl Pierre Daubigny, Achille Oudinot, Hippolyte Camille Delpy, Albert Charpin and Pierre Emmanuel Damoye. The two painters who introduced the Barbizon School in Portugal in 1879, António da Silva Porto and João Marques de Oliveira, were also his disciples.

Upon learning of Daubigny's death, Vincent van Gogh wrote in a letter:

It must be truly good, when one dies, to be conscious of having done a thing or two in truth, knowing that as a result one will continue to live in the memory of at least a few, and having left a good example to those who follow. If others appear later, they can do no better than to follow in the footsteps of such predecessors and to do it the same way.

Daubigny’s house and studio at Auvers-sur-Oise became a kind of pilgrimage site for many artists, including Cézanne and also van Gogh, who (with permission of the artist's widow) painted Daubigny's garden three times. In 2016, the Van Gogh Museum in Amsterdam presented Daubigny, Monet, Van Gogh: Impressions of Landscape, an exhibition of 63 paintings and 16 works on paper by Daubigny and the Impressionist and Post-Impressionist painters he influenced.

== Paintings ==
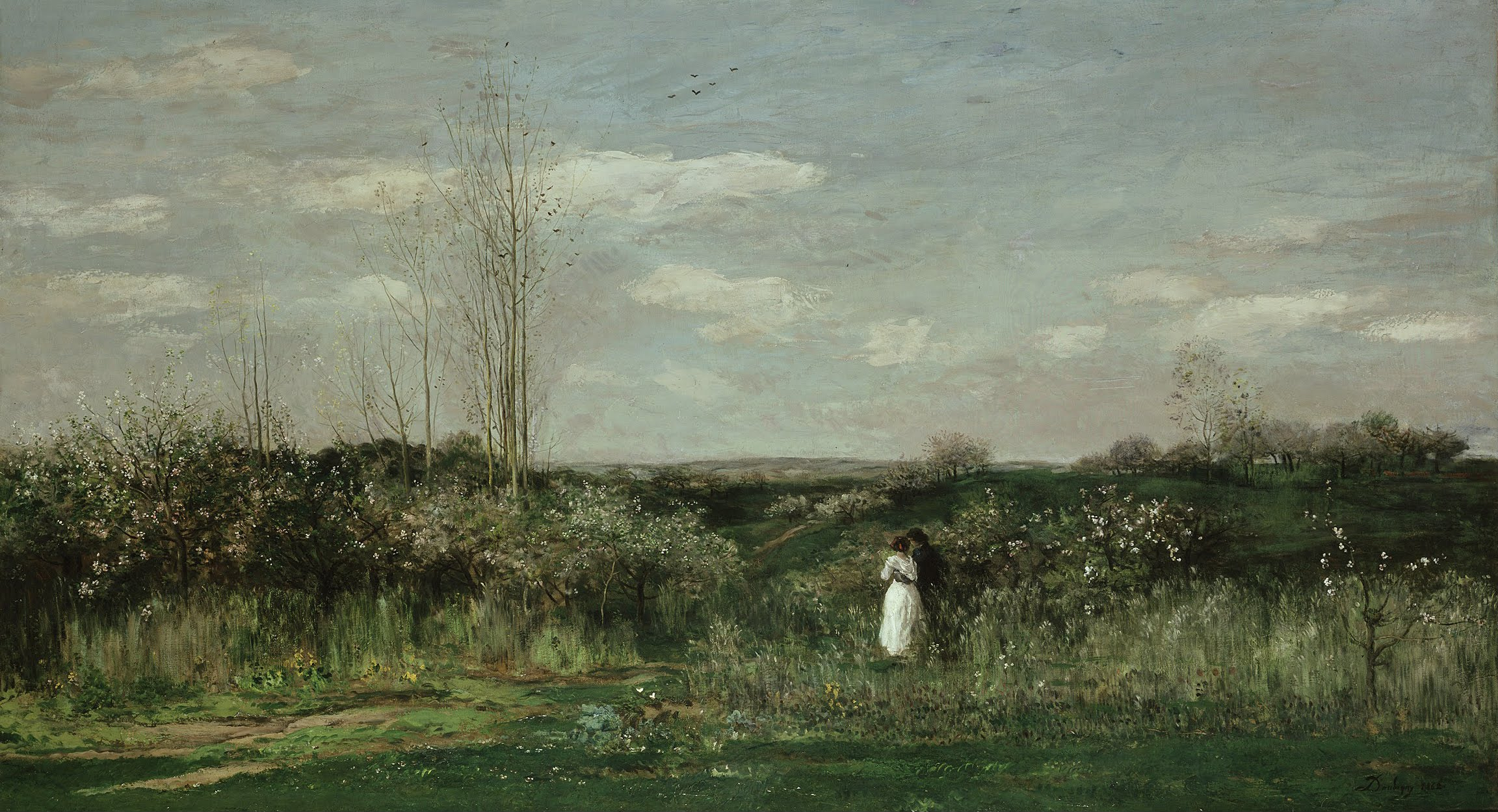
Charles-François Daubigny, Spring (1862)

The most striking paintings by Daubigny were those produced between 1864 and 1874, which depict mostly forest landscapes and lakes. Disappointed because he felt that he did not meet with the same level of success and admiration as his contemporaries, by the end of his career he was nonetheless an extremely sought-after and appreciated artist. The motifs of his paintings, sometimes tending towards repetitiveness and often playing on the horizontality of the landscape underlined by a backlight effect, would be taken up and accentuated by Hippolyte Camille Delpy, his most influenced student.

His most ambitious canvases include Springtime (1857), in the Louvre; Borde de la Cure, Morvan (1864); Villerville sur Mer (1864); Moonlight (1865); Auvers-sur-Oise (1868); and Return of the Flock (1878). He was named by the French government as an Officer of the Legion of Honor.

== In popular culture ==
The life of Daubigny was adapted into a graphic novel by Belgian comics writer Bruno de Roover and artist Luc Cromheecke. It appeared under the title De Tuin van Daubigny in 2016, and in an ebook English translation by James Vandermeersch, as Daubigny's Garden, in 2017.

== Public collections ==
Among the public collections holding works by Charles-François Daubigny are:

- The Art Institute of Chicago
- Cincinnati Art Museum
- The Frick Collection, New York
- The Hermitage, Saint Petersburg
- Mesdag Collectie, The Hague
- The Israel Museum, Jerusalem
- Kunstmuseum Den Haag, The Hague
- Metropolitan Museum of Art, New York
- Montreal Museum of Fine Arts
- Musée du Louvre, Paris
- Musée d'Orsay, Paris
- Museum de Fundatie, Zwolle
- Museum of Fine Arts, Boston
- National Gallery of Canada, Ottawa
- National Galleries of Scotland, Edinburgh
- National Gallery, London
- National Gallery of Art, Washington, D.C.
- Neue Pinakothek, Munich
- Rijksmuseum, Amsterdam
- Smithsonian American Art Museum, Washington, D.C.

== Gallery ==
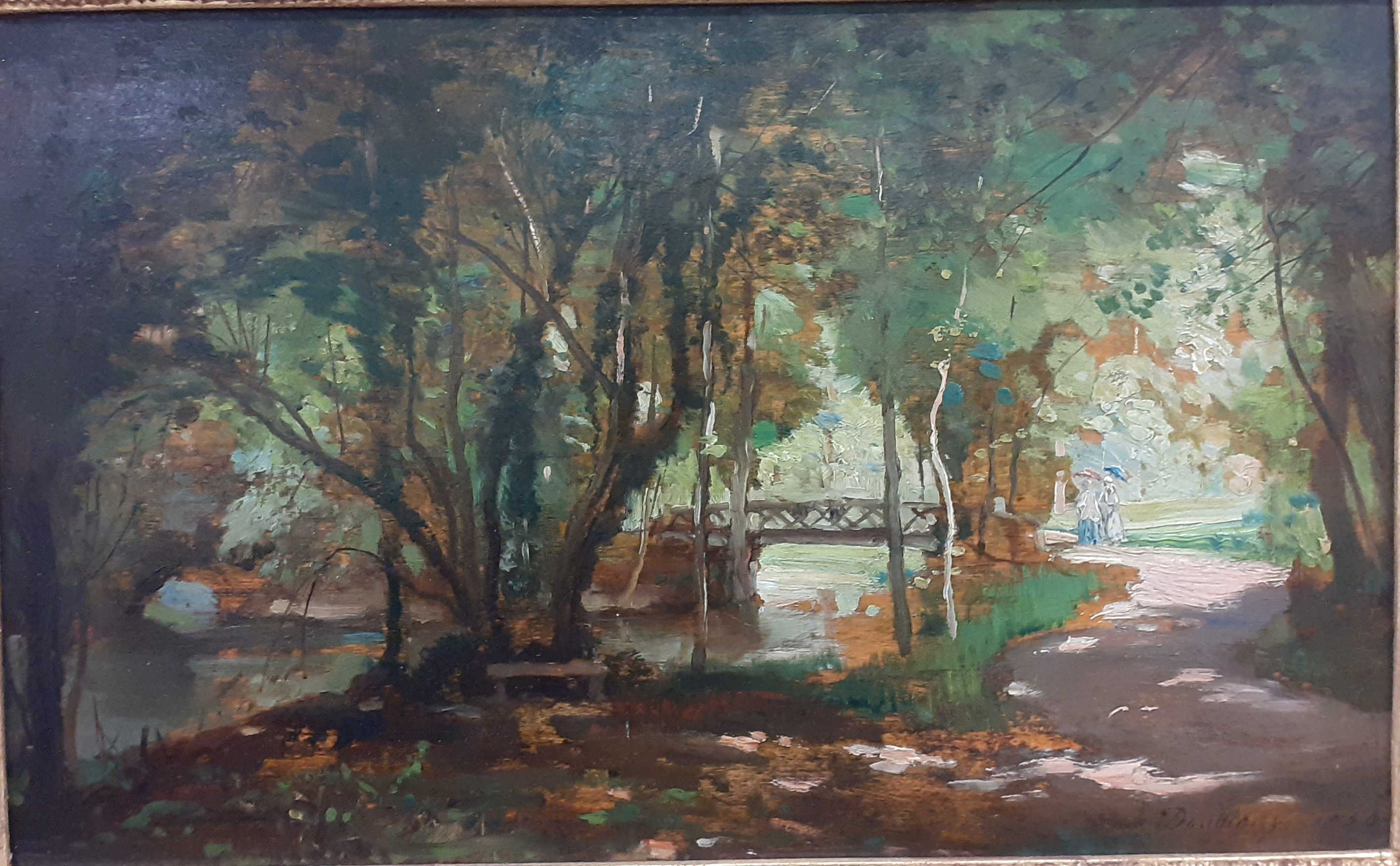
Pool Beneath Trees (1850), Museum of Modern Art André Malraux, Le Havre

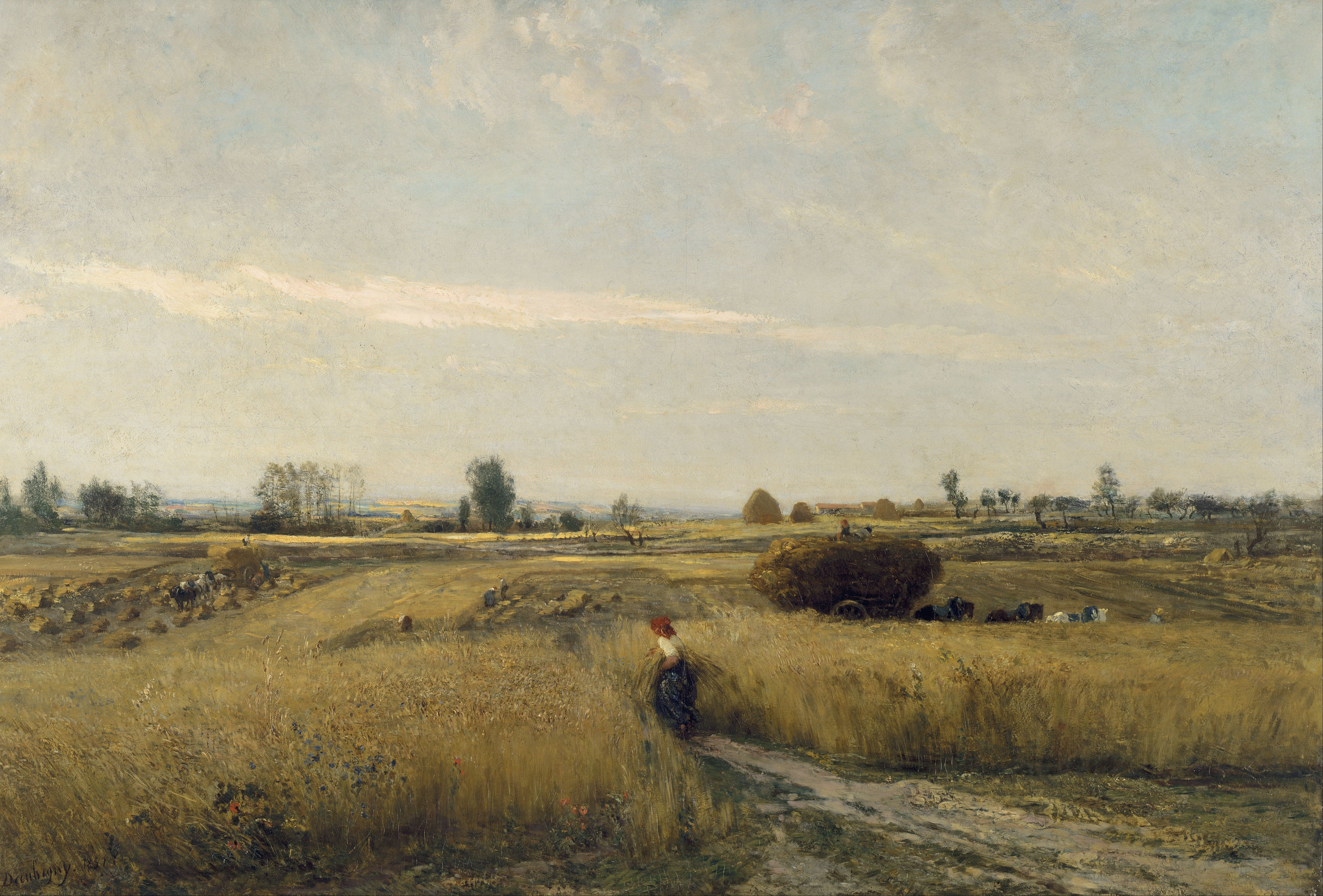
The Harvest (1851), Musée d'Orsay, Paris

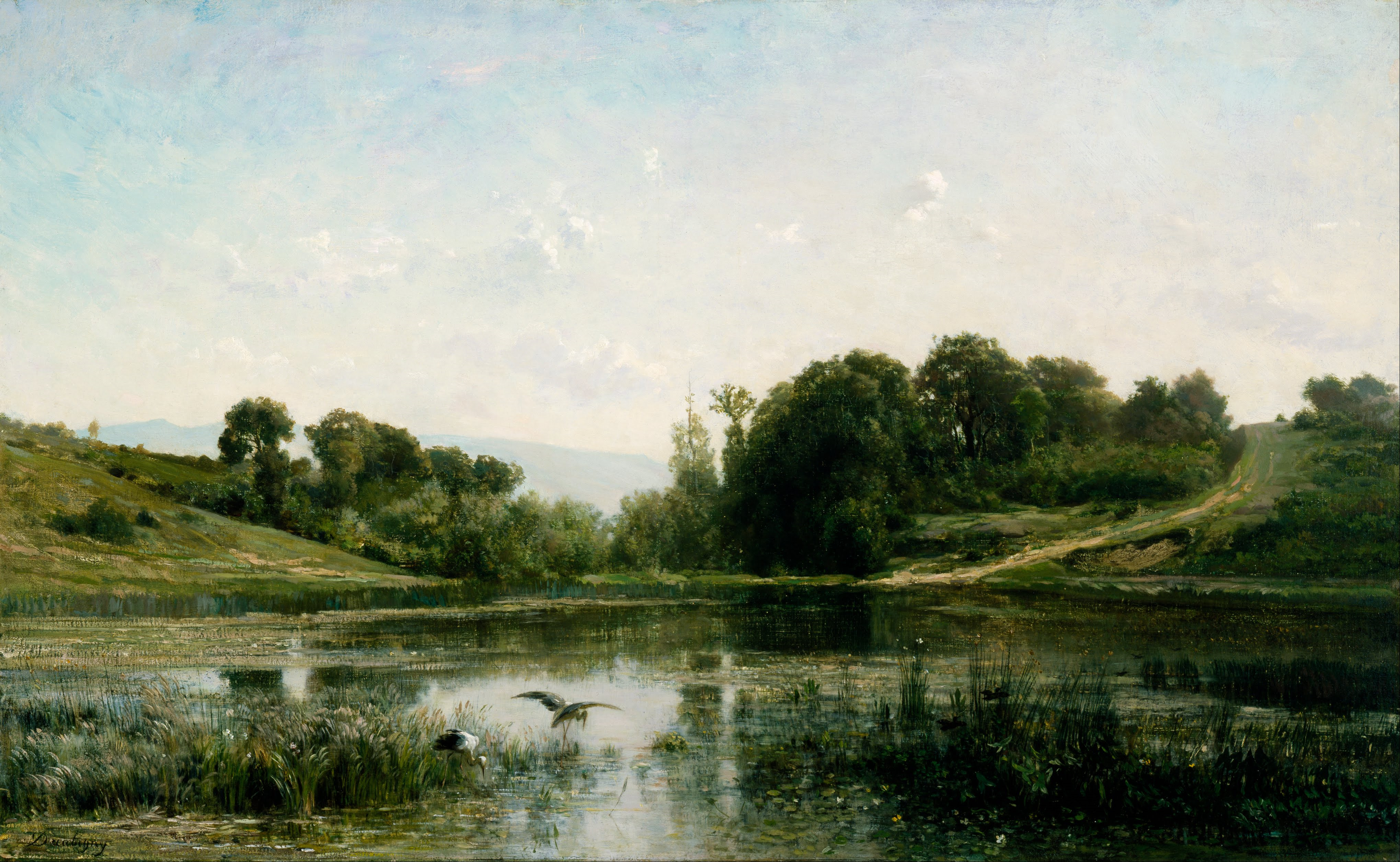
The Ponds of Gylieu (1853), Cincinnati Art Museum

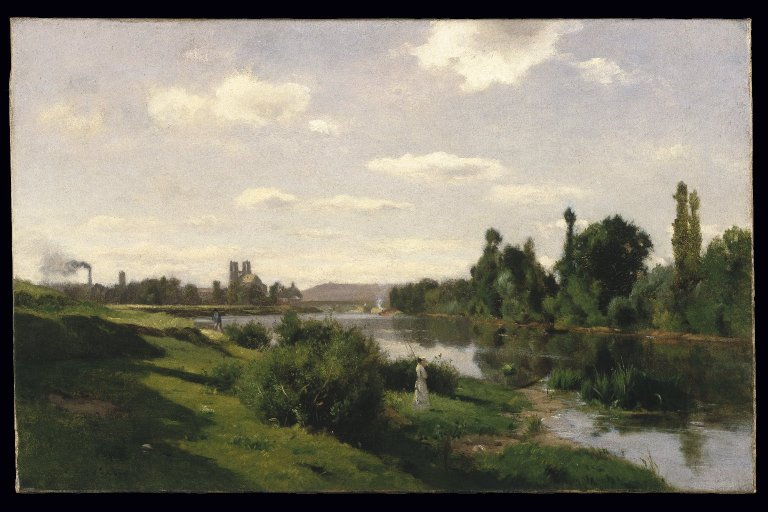
The River Seine at Mantes (1856), Brooklyn Museum

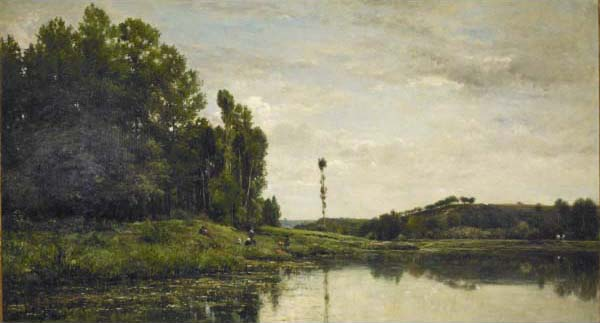
Banks of the Oise (1863), Saint Louis Art Museum

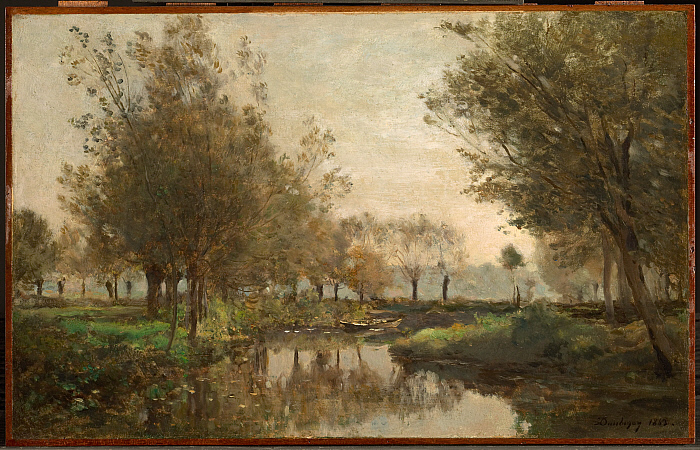
The Creek (1863), Clark Art Institute, Williamstown, Massachusetts

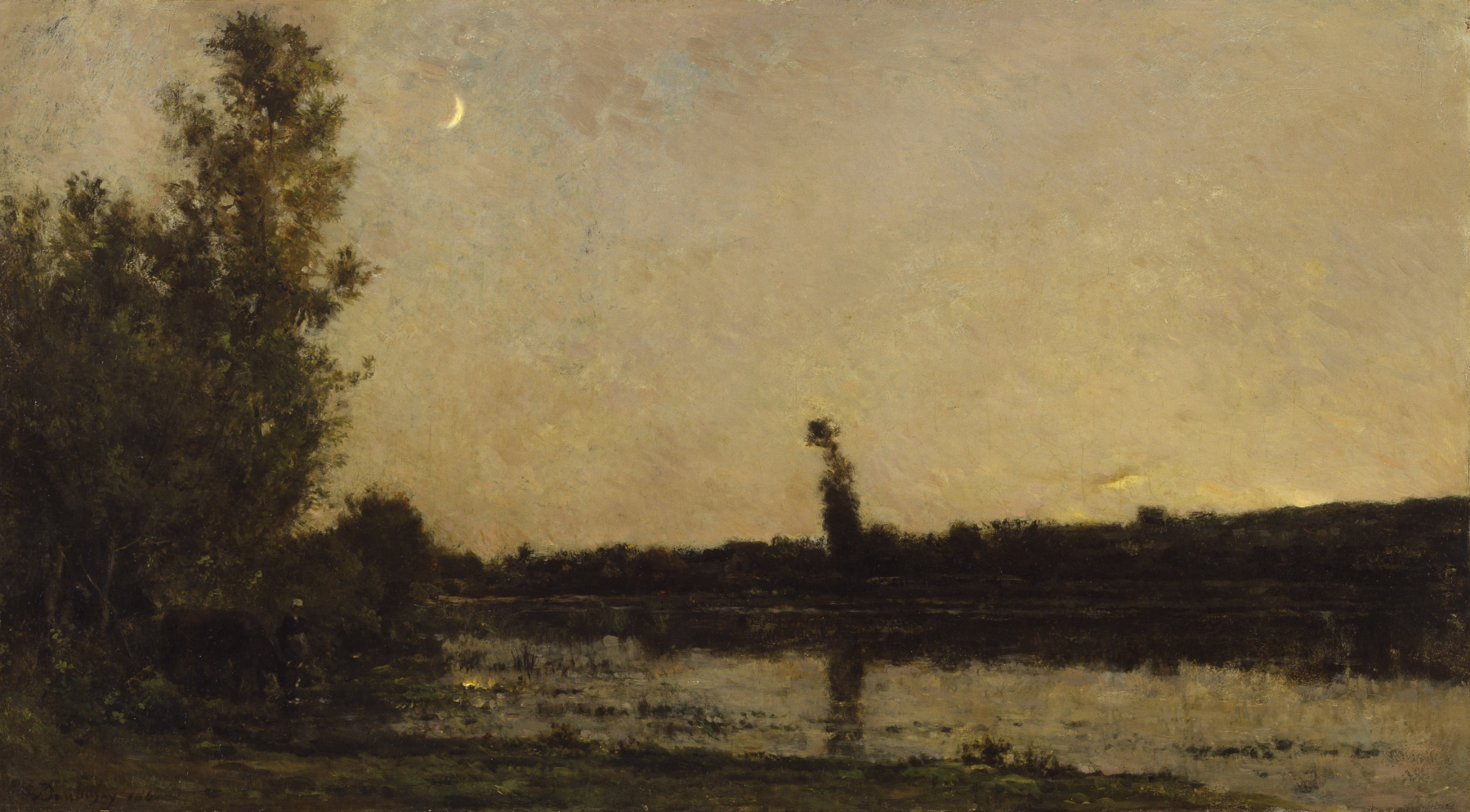
Twilight (1866), Walters Art Museum, Baltimore

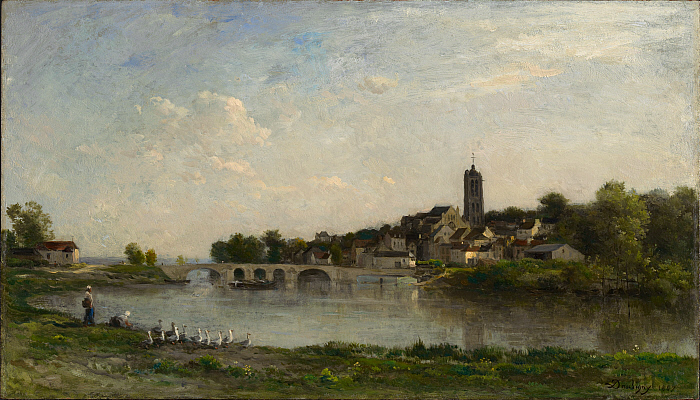
The Bridge between Persan and Beaumont-sur-Oise (1867), Clark Art Institute, Williamstown, Massachusetts

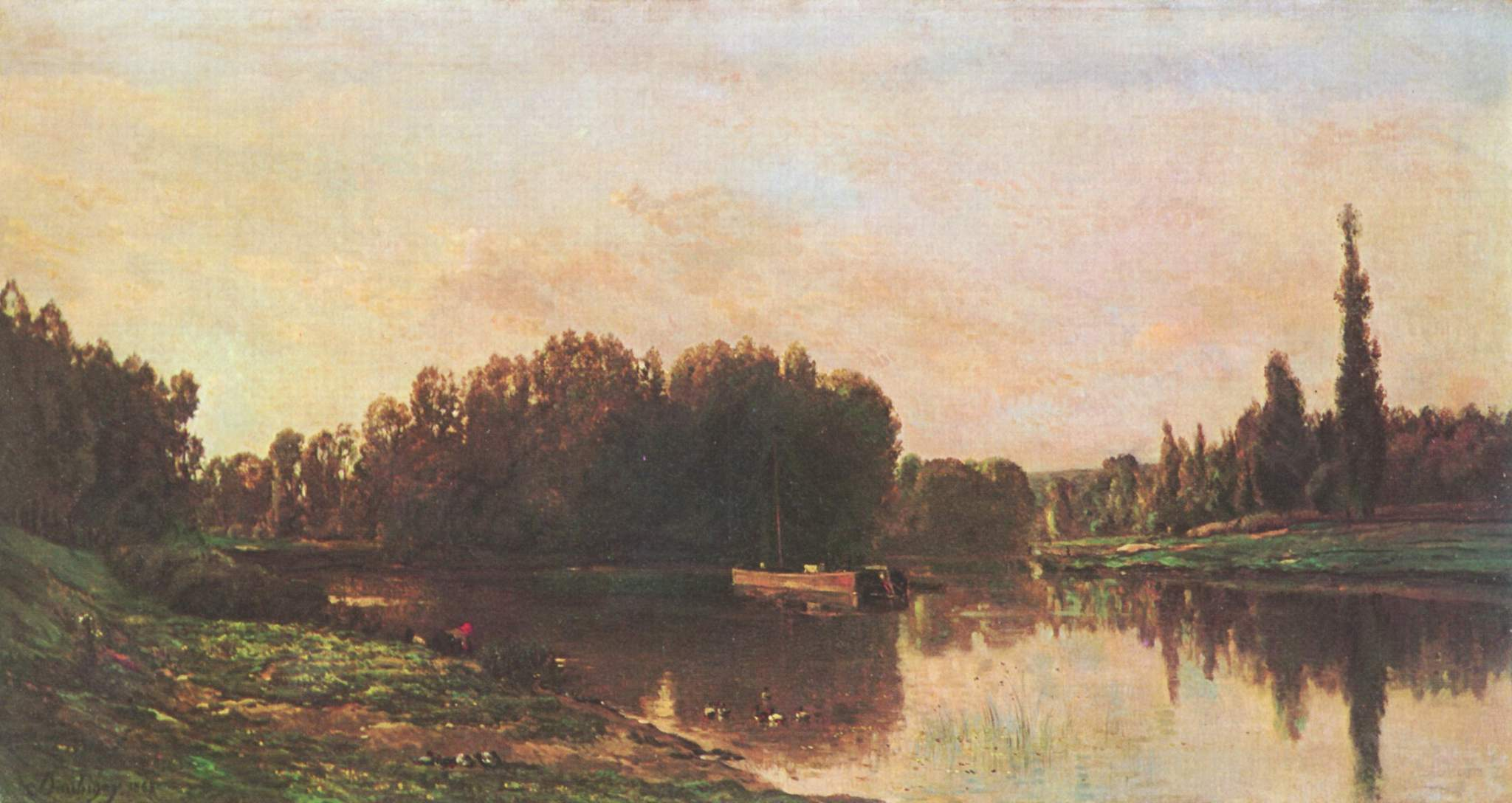
La Confluence de la Seine et de l'Oise (1868), Museum of Fine Arts, Budapest

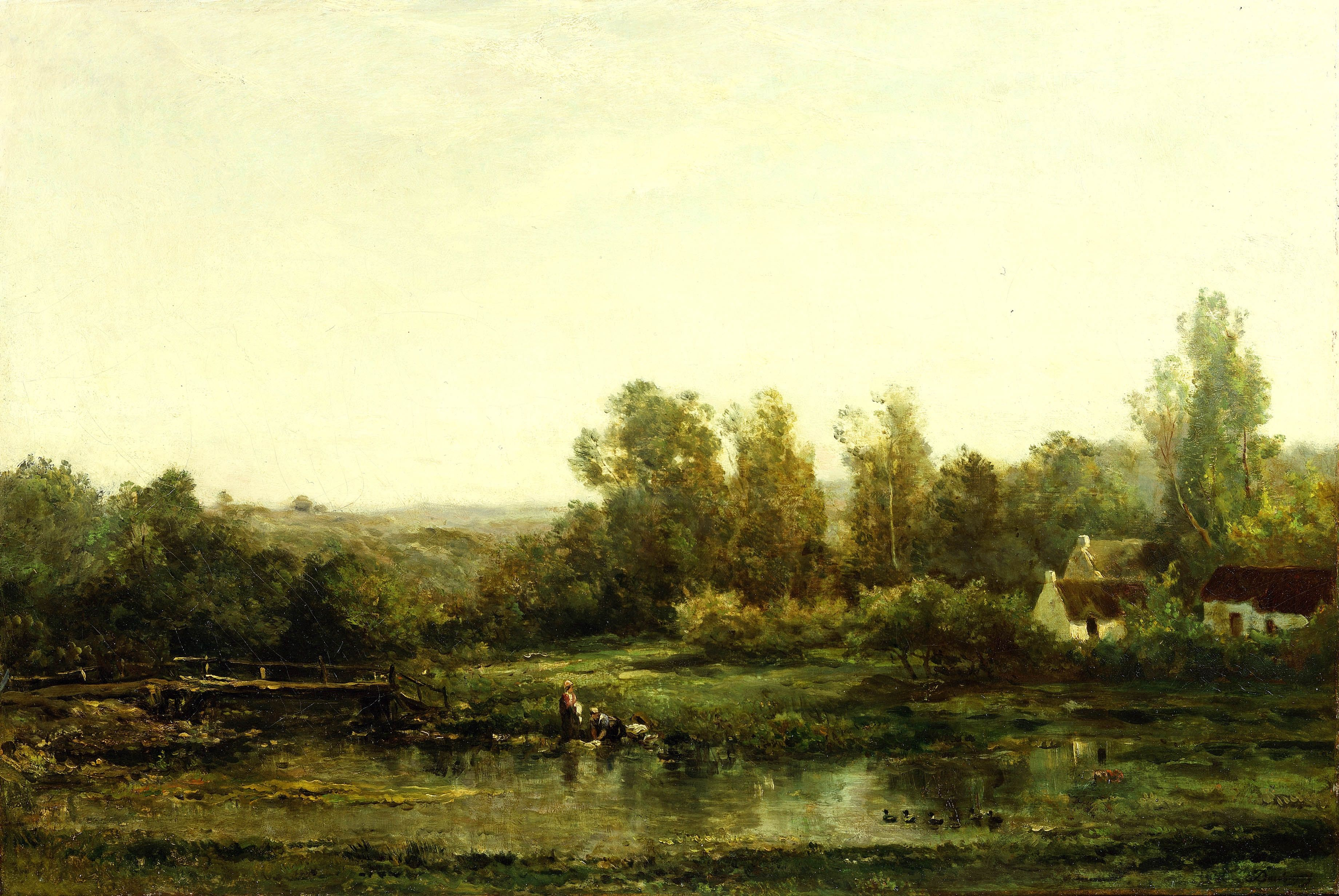
Les Blanchisseuses (1870–1874), The Frick Collection, New York

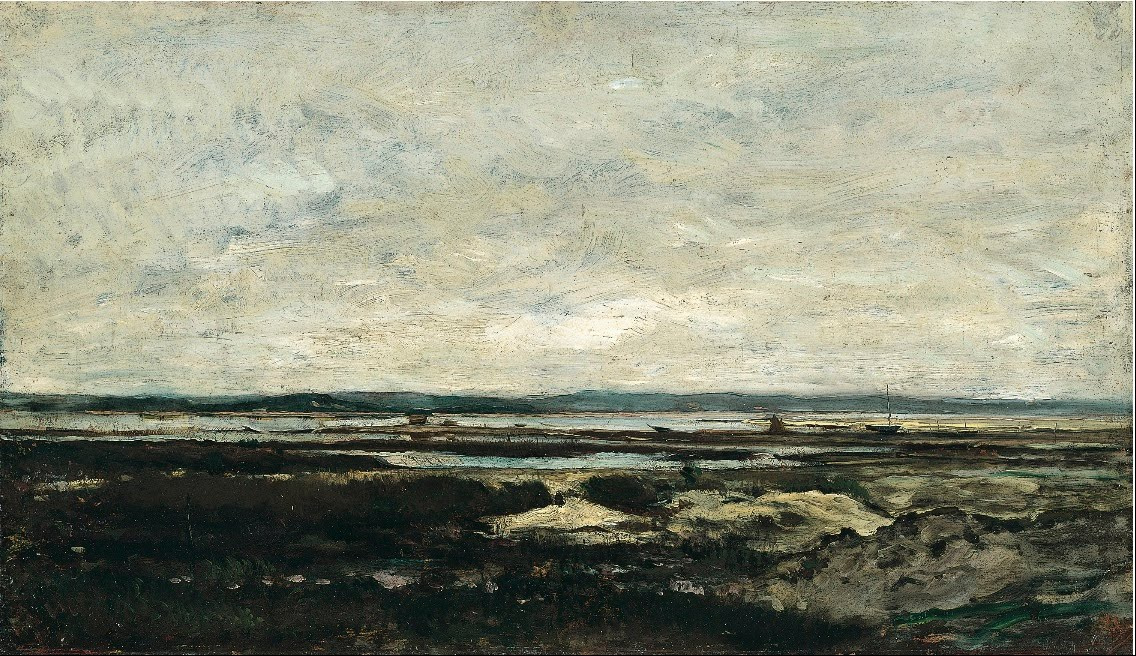
Les Sables-d'Olonne, Artizon Museum, Tokyo

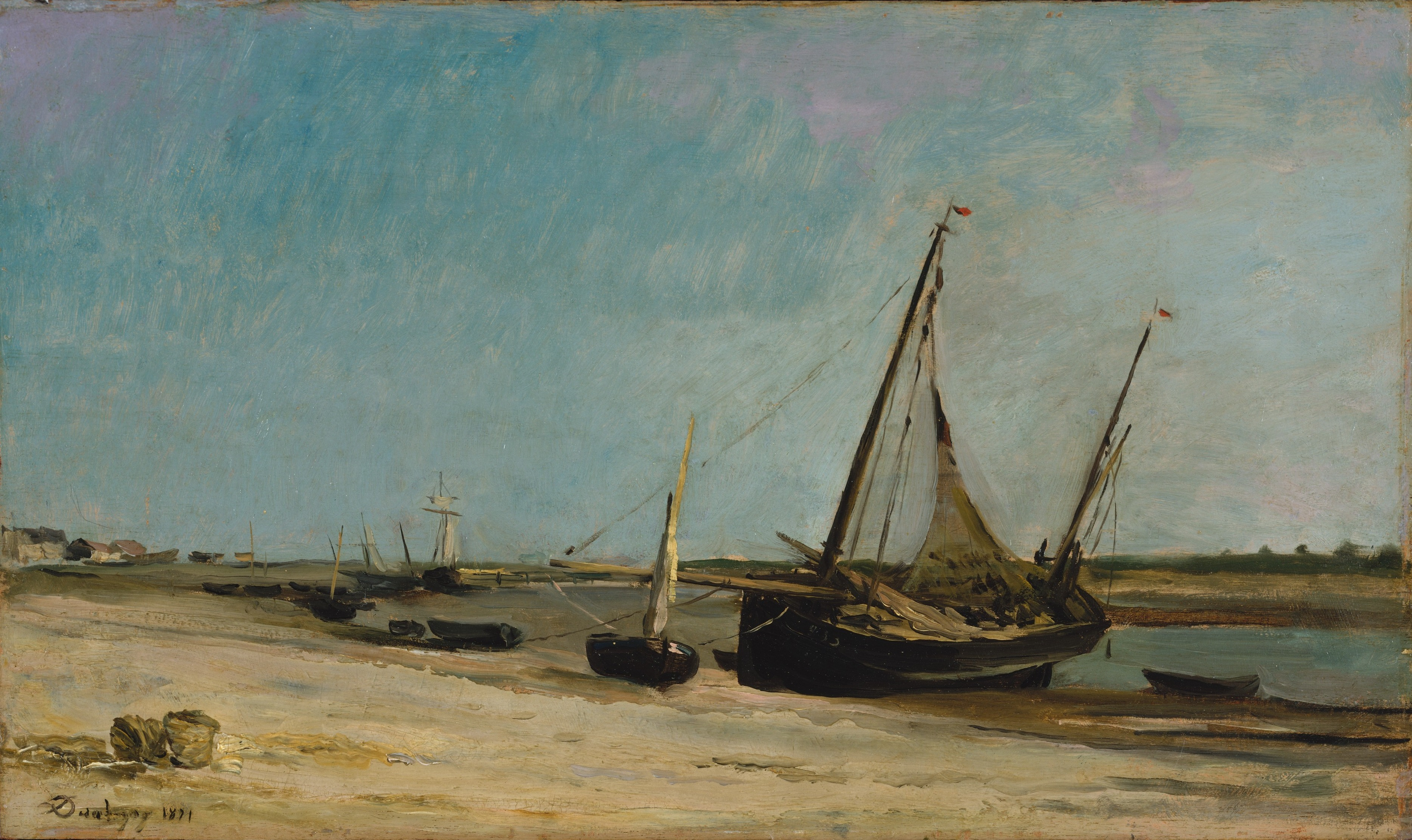
Boats on the Seacoast at Étaples (1871), Metropolitan Museum of Art, New York

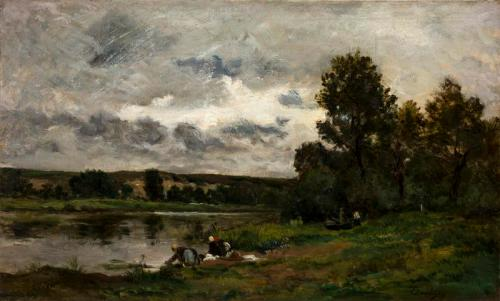
Les Laveuses (1873), Aberdeen Art Gallery

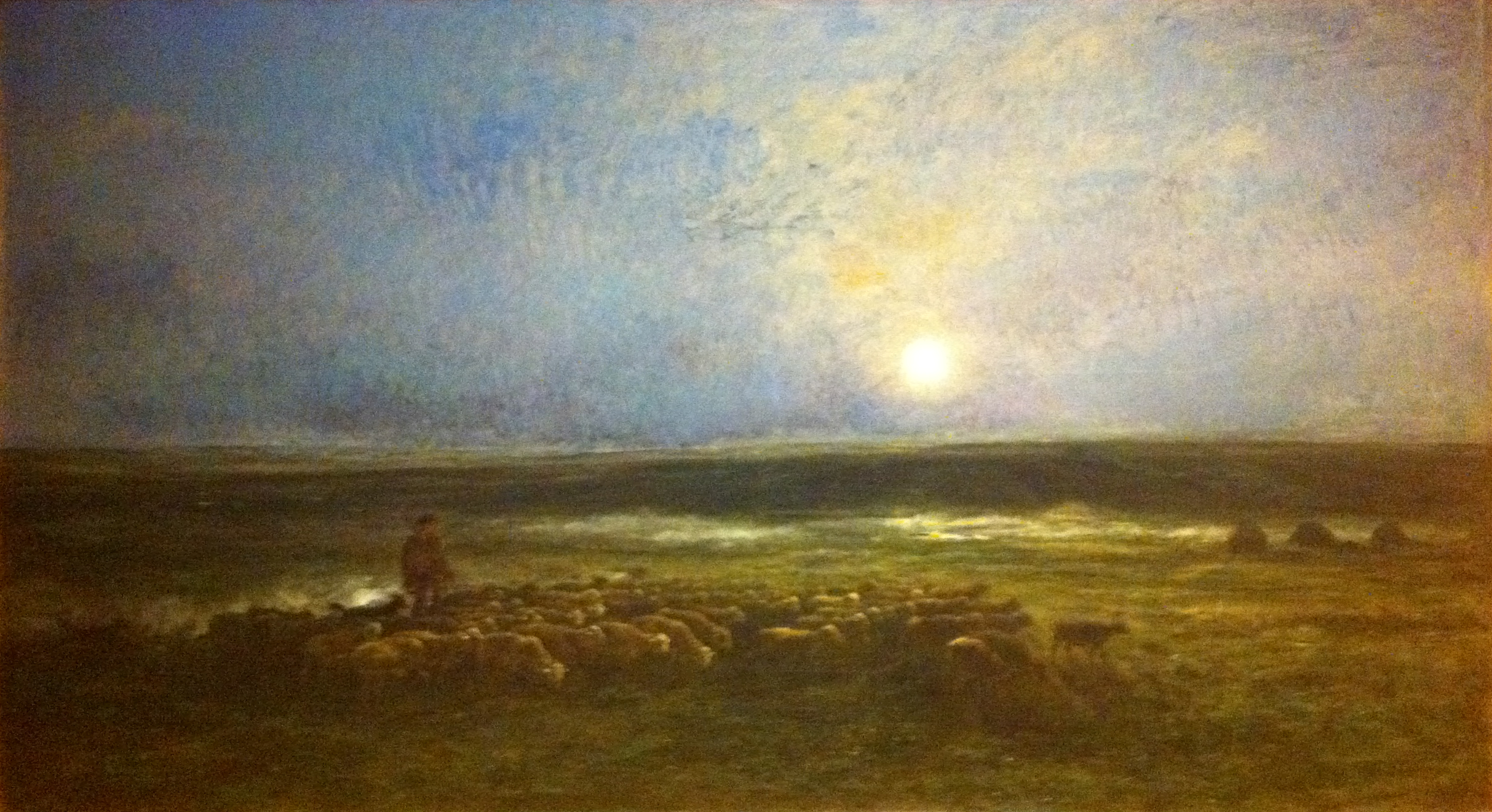
Lever de lune à Auvers, or Le Retour du troupeau (1878), Montreal Museum of Fine Arts

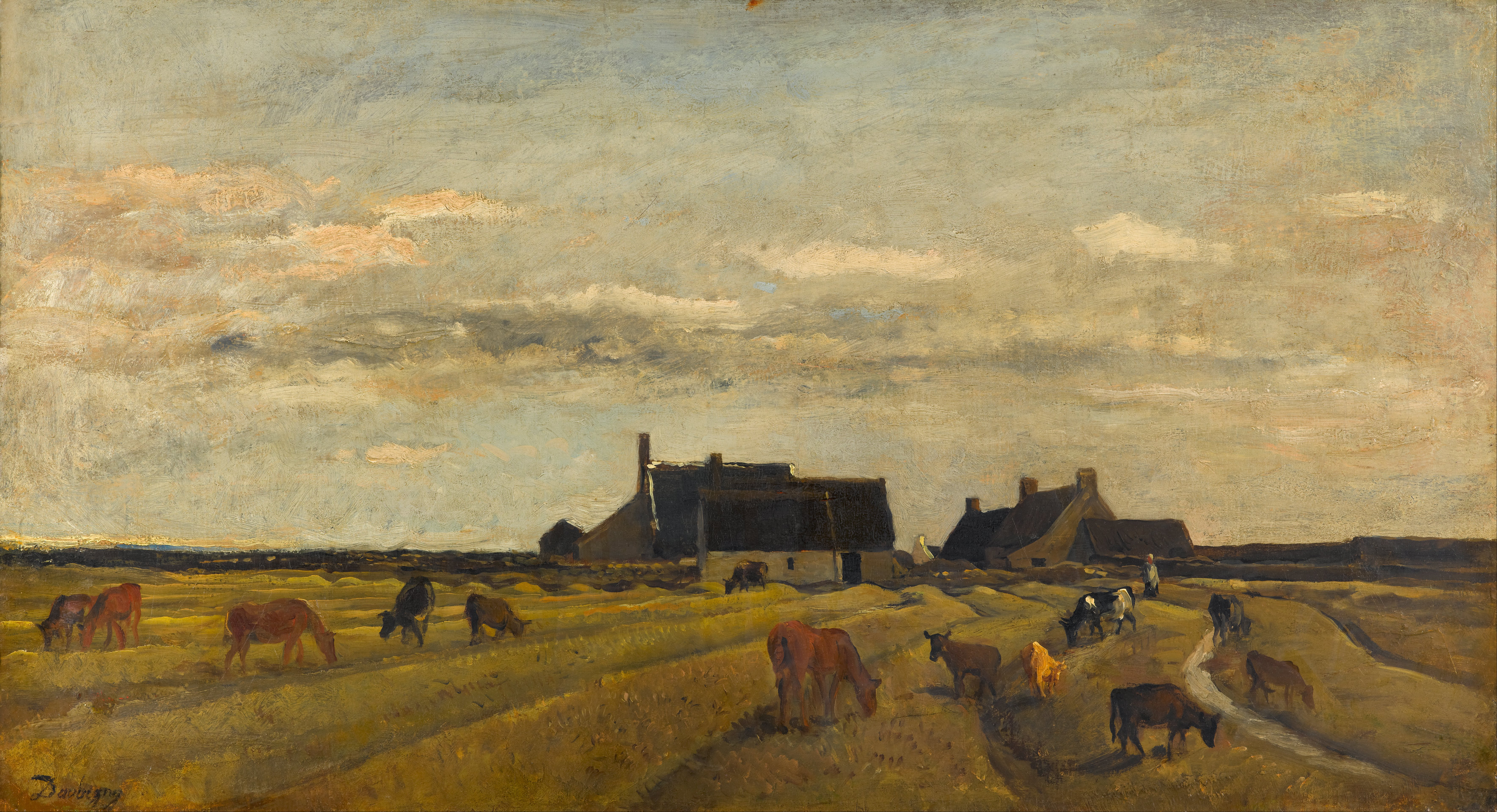
Farm at Kerity, Kunstmuseum Den Haag, The Hague

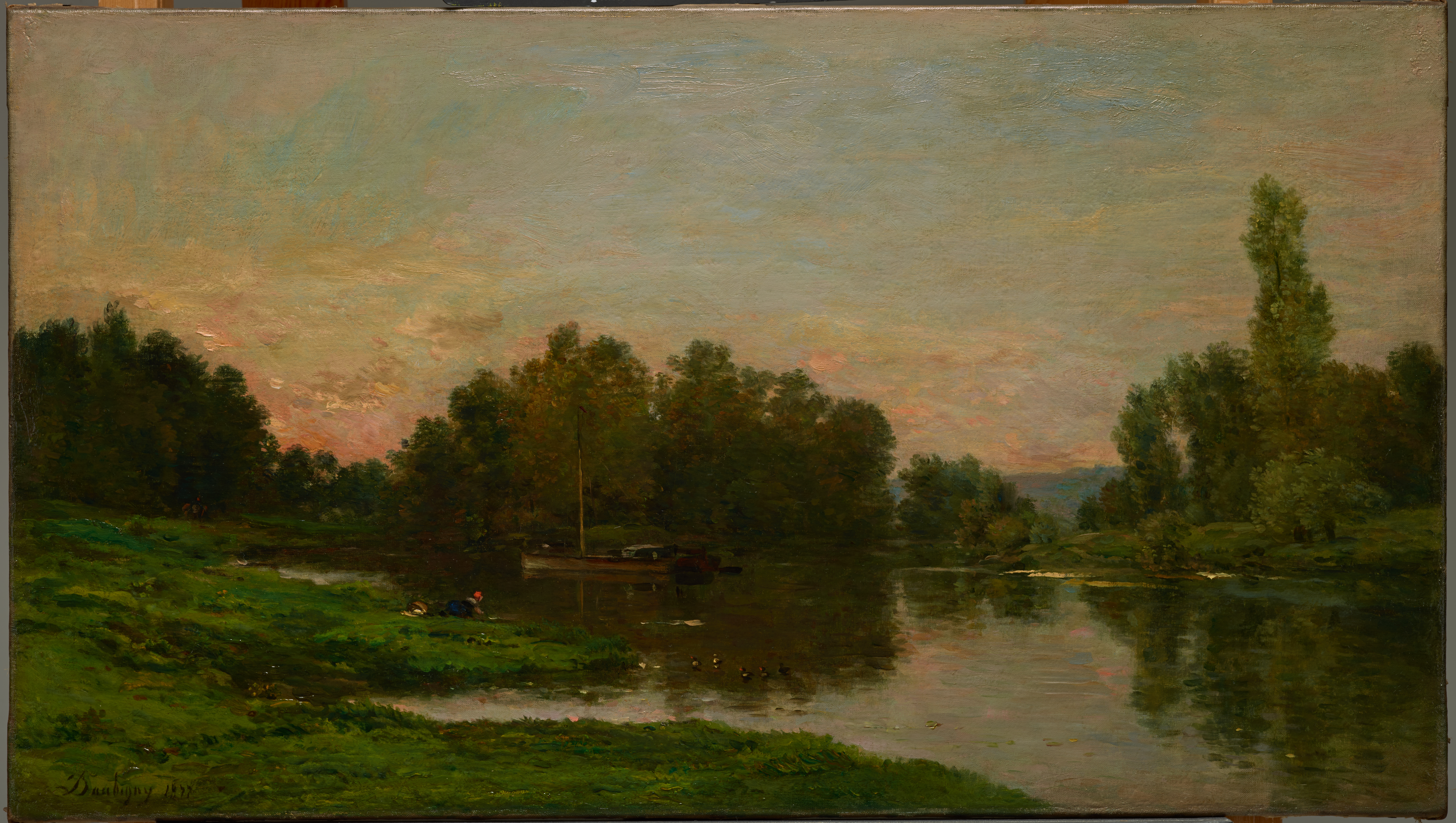
The Painter’s Barge at the Ile de Vaux on the Oise River (1877), Dallas Museum of Art

== See also ==
- Daubigny's Garden, painted three times by Vincent van Gogh
