= Luke Schaub =

British diplomat

Sir Luke Schaub
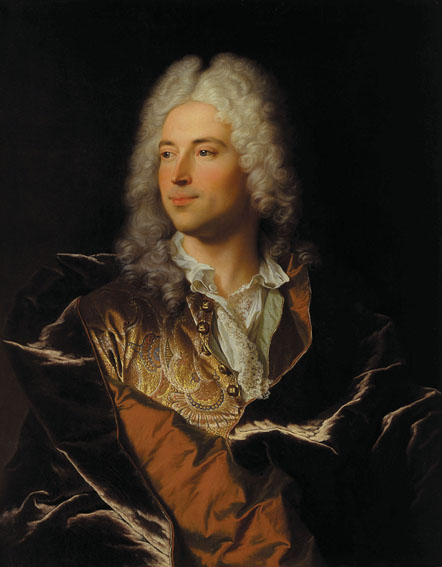
- Portrait by Hyacinthe Rigaud, 1722 (Kunstmuseum Basel)
- Born: Lukas Schaub; 1 May 1690; Basel, Switzerland
- Died: 27 February 1758 (aged 67); London, England

Sir Luke Schaub (also Lukas Schaub or Lucas Schaub; 1 May 1690 – 27 February 1758) was a Swiss-born diplomat at the British court, a mediator in the service of Swiss Confederate cities, and a military entrepreneur. He spent most of his career in British service, representing Great Britain in Vienna, Paris and Hanover, and was knighted by King George I in 1720.

== Family and education ==
Schaub was born on 1 May 1690 in Basel, Switzerland, the fourth of six children of Hans Heinrich Schaub, a notary, and Barbara Ketterlin. In 1740 he married Marguerite Ligonnier du Buisson, a widow of Huguenot origin and the stepdaughter of his friend François-Louis de Pesmes de Saint-Saphorin. The couple had three children: two daughters and a son who died in infancy. Schaub studied law in Basel from 1707 to 1711.

== Diplomatic career ==
After completing his studies, Schaub became private secretary to Abraham Stanyan, the British ambassador to the Swiss Confederation, whom he accompanied to Britain in 1714 and whose work An Account of Switzerland he translated into French as L'état de la Suisse. The same year, Richard Temple engaged him as private secretary for his mission to the imperial court in Vienna. In 1715 he was promoted to official chargé d'affaires of the British legation to the emperor and formed a friendship with the British resident at the court, François-Louis de Pesmes de Saint-Saphorin. From the autumn of 1717, Schaub assisted James Stanhope as secretary in the negotiations leading to the Quadruple Alliance (Britain, France, Austria and the United Provinces), concluded in 1718. After short stays in Paris and Madrid, he settled in Hanover in 1719.

That same year, Schaub successfully mediated the so-called Stockschlaghandel ("affair of the stick blow") between France and the Canton of Basel, in which the Council of Basel saw its sovereign jurisdiction threatened by proceedings opened after a former Basel lieutenant-colonel in French service was physically assaulted. In 1720 he was knighted (Knight Bachelor) by King George I in Hanover and appointed British ambassador to France. Foreign-policy conflicts within the British Council of Ministers led to his recall to Britain in 1724 and the loss of his official diplomatic status. Schaub's continued good relations with the British royal family and with influential members of the French court nevertheless allowed him to undertake further diplomatic missions in subsequent years. He took part in the negotiations for the renewal of the Franco-Swiss alliance (1725–1726 and 1738–1739), served as King George II's special envoy in dealings with the King of Poland (1730–1731), and acted as adviser in the settlement of disputes with Prussia (1754).

In 1735, the Republic of Geneva called on Schaub's services in a dispute with the King of Sardinia. During the Geneva troubles of 1736–1737 (the affaire du Tamponnement), Schaub acted as the unofficial spokesman of the Genevan government at the British court and, as mediator, resolved the so-called "Salmon War" (Lachsfangstreit) between Basel and France over the Rhine border and fishing rights.

== Military entrepreneurship in India ==
During the Anglo-French colonial wars in India (1744–1763), the British East India Company for the first time systematically recruited troops on the European continent. In July 1751 it concluded a contract with Schaub for the recruitment of four Swiss companies under the captains Johann Heinrich Schaub (one of his nephews), John Chabbert, Paul Philippe Polier and Alexander Ziegler. The Swiss troops obeyed their own penal and honor codes, which the East India Company nevertheless ignored. The resulting conflict between Confederate captains and British officers also affected Schaub and led, from 1755, to the cessation of British recruitment of autonomous Swiss units. At his death in London in 1758 he left a substantial collection of paintings, which was sold at public auction.

== Bibliography ==
- Kilchenmann, Johann Eduard: Schweizersöldner im Dienste der Englisch-Ostindischen Kompanie um die Mitte des 18. Jahrhunderts. Ein Beitrag zur Geschichte der Englischen Unternehmungen in Vorderindien, 1911.
- Massini, Rudolf: "Sir Luke Schaub (1690–1758). Ein Basler im diplomatischen Dienst Englands", in: Neujahrsblatt herausgegeben von der Gesellschaft zur Beförderung des Guten und Gemeinnützigen, 132, 1954, pp. 1–76.
- Woodfine, Philip: "Schaub, Sir Luke (1690–1758)", in: Oxford Dictionary of National Biography, vol. 49, 2004, pp. 205–206.
- Tzoref-Ashkenazi, Chen: German Soldiers in Colonial India, 2016.
- Affolter, Andreas: Verhandeln mit Republiken. Die französisch-eidgenössischen Beziehungen im frühen 18. Jahrhundert, 2017.

Diplomatic posts
Preceded by Sir Robert Sutton	British Ambassador to France; 1721–1724	Succeeded by The Lord Walpole of Wolterton
