= Daniel Frischmann =

Swiss military officer and merchant (1728-1808)

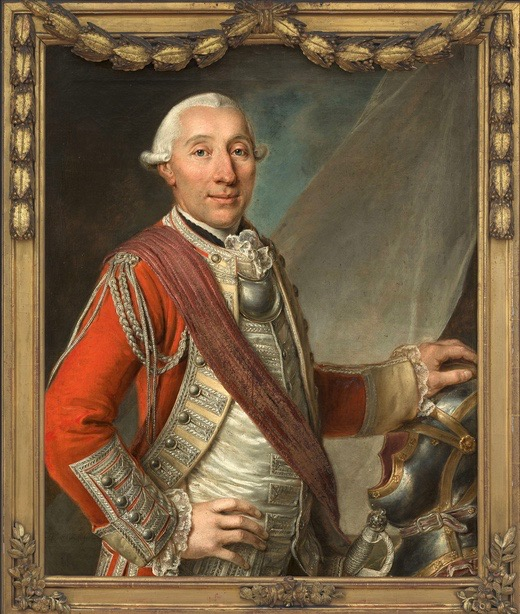
- Frischmann in the uniform of colonel of the East India Company. Portrait by Johann Nikolaus Grooth, 1772.
- Born: May 20, 1728; Basel, Swiss Confederation
- Died: June 15, 1808 (aged 80); Basel, Swiss Confederation
- Occupations: Military officer, merchant, politician
- Spouse: Sybilla Heitz (m. 1773)
- Children: Johann Albrecht Frischmann, Sibylle Frischmann
- Parent(s): Johann Rudolf Frischmann, Johanna Burckhardt

Daniel Frischmann (20 May 1728 – 15 June 1808) was a Swiss mercenary, merchant, and politician from Basel. He served as an officer in the British East India Company forces in India and later became a prominent businessman and political figure in Basel.

== Early life and education ==
Daniel Frischmann was born on 20 May 1728 in Basel to Johann Rudolf Frischmann, a swordsmith, and Johanna Burckhardt. His uncle, merchant Daniel Burckhardt, served as equerry to the British envoy in Constantinople. After attending the gymnasium, Frischmann was orphaned at a young age. In 1739, he travelled to Neuchâtel for language studies, and from 1741 he undertook a commercial apprenticeship in Basel.

== Military career in India ==
In 1747, Frischmann travelled to the Dutch Republic, and in 1751 he entered the Swiss battalion of the British East India Company in Amsterdam as a cadet. He was recruited for foreign military service by John Henri Schaub, without official authorization, on behalf of Swiss-born British diplomat Luke Schaub.

Frischmann arrived in Madras, India in 1752, where he was taken prisoner by the French and kept for two years in Pondicherry. After returning to Madras in 1754, he was again captured by the French for six months in 1758 while serving as lieutenant and aide-major at Cuddalore. Frischmann was promoted to captain during the Siege of Madras in 1758-1759. In 1763, he was promoted to lieutenant colonel and took command of a unit near Cape Comorin in 1764. Frischmann reached the rank of colonel during active campaign and was appointed commander of Madras and Fort St. George in 1769.

== Return to Basel and commercial activities ==
Frischmann returned to Basel in 1770 due to health reasons but maintained correspondence with officers from his regiment, including Noé Antoine Abraham Bonjour. He had accumulated a considerable fortune of 150,000-200,000 florins during his final four years in India, according to his contemporary Christoph Adam Carl von Imhoff, a German officer in British East India Company service.

He devoted himself primarily to managing his wealth and maintained correspondence with commercial partners. His investments included international and colonial enterprises, notably Jean Duval & fils and Johann Friedrich Iselin in London, Senn, Bidermann & Co. in Paris, and the Société maritime suisse.

In 1773, Frischmann married Sybilla Heitz, daughter of Johann Heinrich Heitz, a banker and director of Basel's Chamber of Commerce, and Charlotte Louise Ochs. The couple had two children: Johann Albrecht and Sibylle Frischmann.

== Political career and death ==
In 1784, Frischmann became a member of the Schlüsselzunft as a sizenier. During the Helvetic Republic, he served as commissioner for the redemption of tithes. From 1804 to 1807, he was a member of the Grand Council for the Basel district, and in 1808 he became a member of Basel's Small Council. Frischmann died on 15 June 1808 in Basel, aged 80.

== Bibliography ==
- Burghartz, Susanna: «Aufbruch in den Kapitalismus, 1670-1810», in: Burghartz, Susanna (ed.): Aufbrüche, Krisen, Transformationen. Zwischen Reformation und Revolution. Basel 1510-1790, 2024, pp. 236-275.
- Imhoff, Christoph Adam Carl von: Imhoff – Indienfahrer. Ein Reisebericht aus dem 18. Jahrhundert in Briefen und Bildern, edited by Gerhard Koch, 2001.
- Kilchenmann, Johann Eduard: Schweizersöldner im Dienste der Englisch-Ostindischen Kompanie um die Mitte des 18. Jahrhunderts. Ein Beitrag zur Geschichte der Englischen Unternehmungen in Vorderindien, 1911.
- Lätt, Arnold: Der Anteil der Schweizer an der Eroberung Indiens, 1933.
- Tzoref-Ashkenazi, Chen: German Soldiers in Colonial India, 2014.
