= Huningue =

Commune in Grand Est, France

- Commune
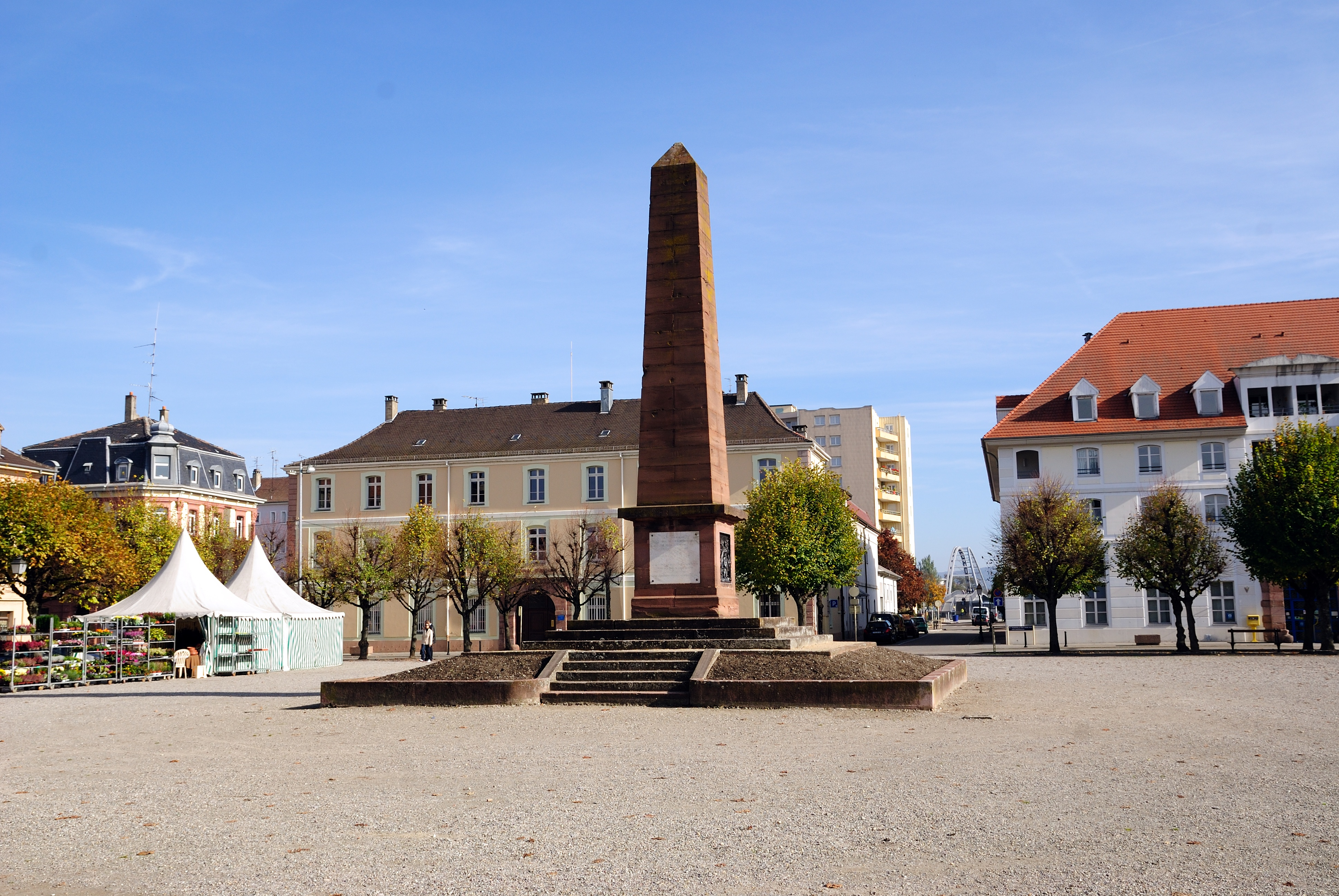
- Place Abbatucci

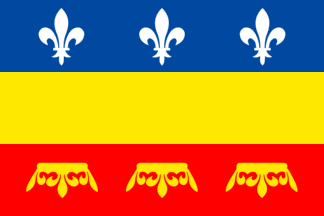
- Flag Coat of arms
- Location of Huningue
- Location within France Location within Grand Est
- Coordinates: 47°35′31″N 7°35′04″E
- Country: France
- Region: Grand Est
- Department: Haut-Rhin
- Arrondissement: Mulhouse
- Canton: Saint-Louis
- Intercommunality: Saint-Louis Agglomération

Government
  - Mayor (2020–2026): Jules Féron
- Area^{1}: 2.86 km^{2} (1.10 sq mi)
- Highest elevation: 259 m (850 ft)
- Lowest elevation: 242 m (794 ft)
- Population (2023): 7,487
  - Density: 2,620/km^{2} (6,780/sq mi)
- Time zone: UTC+01:00 (CET)
  - Summer (DST): UTC+02:00 (CEST)
- INSEE/Postal code: 68149 /68330
- Dialling codes: 0389
- ^{1} French Land Register data, which excludes lakes, ponds, glaciers > 1 km^{2} (0.386 sq mi or 247 acres) and river estuaries.

Huningue (French pronunciation: [ynɛ̃ɡ]; German: Hüningen; Alsatian: Hinige) is a commune in the Haut-Rhin department of France. Huningue is a northern suburb of the Swiss city of Basel. (Note: Under the treaty of Paris (1815) the spelling of the town in the official English translation was Huninguen (as it was in many other contemporary English language sources).) It also borders Germany (Weil am Rhein, a suburb of Basel located in Germany). The main square of the town is the Place Abbatucci, named after the Corsican-born French general Jean Charles Abbatucci who unsuccessfully defended it in 1796 against the Austrians and died here. Huningue is noted for its pisciculture and is a major producer of fish eggs.

== History ==
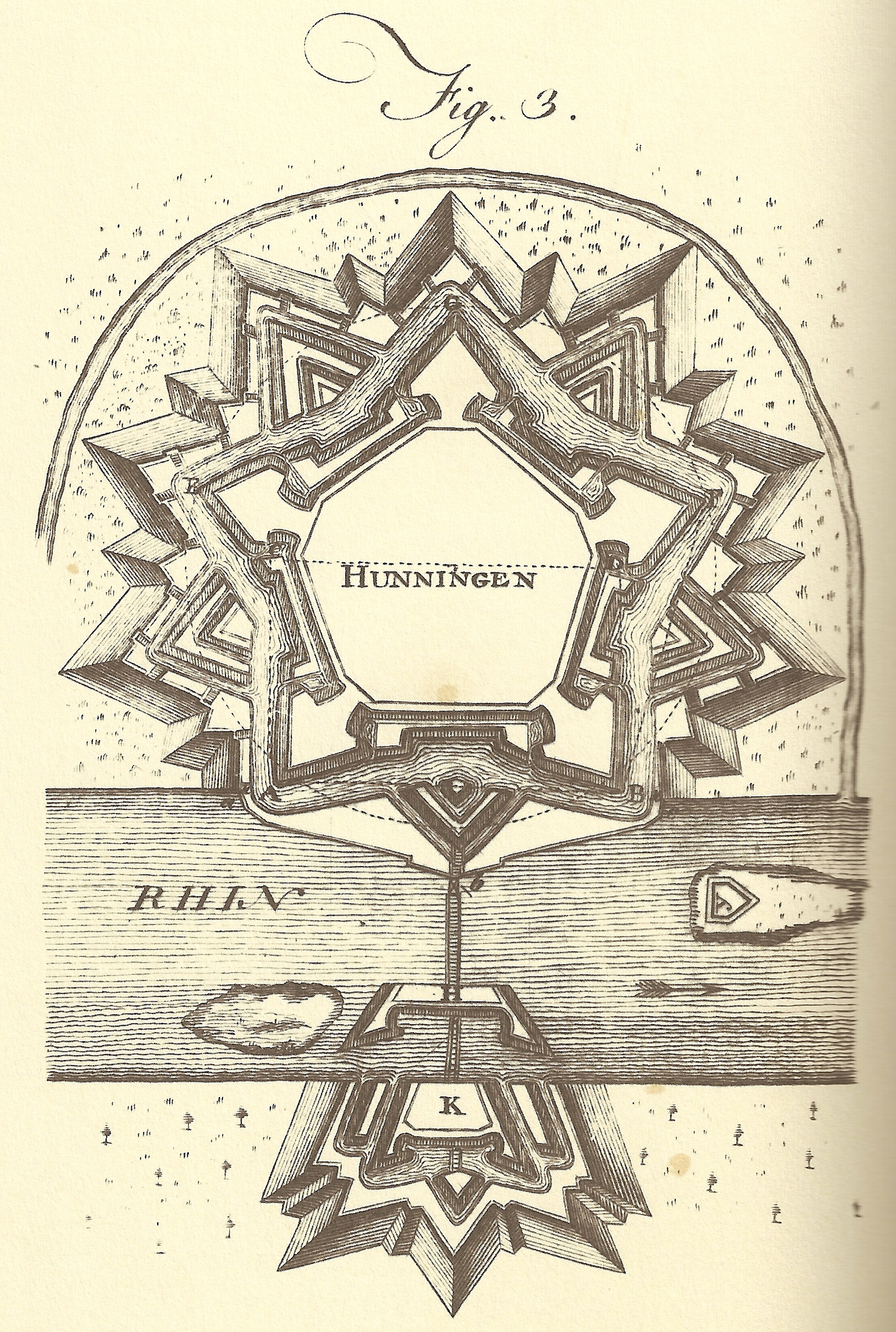
A diagram of Huningue's former fortifications

Huningue was first mentioned in a document in 826. Huningue was wrested from the Holy Roman Empire by the duke of Lauenburg in 1634 by the Treaty of Westphalia, and subsequently passed by purchase to Louis XIV. Louis XIV tasked Vauban with the construction of Huningue Fortress, built by Tarade from 1679 to 1681 together with a bridge across the Rhine. Construction of the fortress required the displacement of the population on the island of Aoust and the surrounding area.

The fortress became embroiled in the Salmon War of 1736/37. This was mainly concerned with a dispute over fishing rights between Huningue and Kleinhüningen, but actually involved land required for the construction of a bridgehead on the right bank of the Rhine.

In 1796 to 1797, Huningue was besieged by the Austrians. During the siege the French Commander, General Abbatucci was killed on 1 December 1796 while commanding a sortie, the fort held out for a further month, surrendering on 5 February 1797. The fortress was besieged from 22 December 1813 until 14 April 1814 by Bavarian troops under the command of General Zoller before the French garrison surrendered. Huningue was besieged for the third time in 1815 and General Barbanègre headed a garrison of only 500 men against 25,000 Austrians. On the 28 June shortly after word of Napoleon's abdication became known, and the French Provisional Government had requested a ceasefire, Barbanègre ordered the bombardment of Basel, something that contemporaries on the Seventh Coalition side considered to be a war crime. At its surrender to the Habsburg Empire on 26 August 1815, the city was a ruin and the fortifications were demolished under the terms of Article III of the Treaty of Paris (1815) at the request of Basel.

The building of the Huningue channel in 1828 made the area more navigable (the entire channel system was completed in 1834); it provided water to the Rhone-Rhine canal. The Huningue canal is a feeder arm of this Rhone–Rhine Canal; it enters the river opposite the main dock basins. Only about a kilometre of the canal is still navigable, leading to the town of Kembs.

In 1871, the town passed, with Alsace-Lorraine, to the German Empire. Alsace-Lorraine returned to France after the First World War. It was evacuated in 1939, retaken by Germany in 1940 with some 60% of the town destroyed during World War II, and finally returned to France once again in 1945. In 2007, a bridge over the Rhine, linking Huningue with Weil am Rhein, Germany was built.

== Geography ==
Huningue is situated on the left bank of the Rhine, and is an ancient place which grew up around a stronghold placed to guard the passage of the river. It is a northern suburb of Basel.

== Population ==
Historical population
Year	Pop.	±% p.a.
1968	5,769	—
1975	6,576	+1.89%
1982	6,679	+0.22%
1990	6,252	−0.82%
1999	6,097	−0.28%
2007	6,376	+0.56%
2012	6,884	+1.54%
2017	7,238	+1.01%
2023	7,487	+0.57%
Source: INSEE

== Economy ==
Huningue is noted for its pisciculture and is a major producer of fish eggs. Several chemical, plastics and pharmaceutical companies have factories in Huningue, mainly Swiss firms such as Novartis, Ciba, Clariant, Hoffmann-La Roche, Weleda etc. The Rhine port is managed by the Chamber of Commerce and the industry of Mulhouse, which lies to the northwest of Huningue.

== Transportation ==
Public transportation in Huningue is provided by Distribus, which serves the entirety of the Saint-Louis Agglomération.

While no longer served by passenger trains Huningue is the terminus for the Saint-Louis–Huningue railway line, and is continued to be served by freight trains.

== Notable landmarks ==
Since March 2007 Huningue has been connected with Weil am Rhein via a 248-metre (814 ft) arch bridge, the longest of its kind for pedestrians and cyclists. Because the bridge connects the two countries, France and Germany, and is near Switzerland it is named the "Three country bridge", or Passerelle des Trois Pays in French.

- Musée historique et militaire: The military and historical museum evokes the military life of the ancient fortress of Vauban. The museum is housed in a former residence of the intendant of the place and commissary.
- L'ancienne église de garnison: the former garrison church was built according to plans of the engineer Jacques Tarade; the church which dominates the Place Abattucci is now disused as a church. The building occasionally hosts chamber concerts. It also serves as a polling station during elections. Since 1938, the facades, the bell tower and the roof have been listed in the inventory of historical monuments.
- Parc des Eaux Vives and the Wheelhouse: a park with an artificial torrent, with kayaking, canoeing, and white water rafting.
- Le Triangle: a cultural complex covering 5540 square metres, divided into 21 activity rooms. Created by architect Jean-Marie Martini, it was inaugurated in February 2002. In addition to the many varied shows (dance, theater, music, circus arts, comedy), the Triangle also hosts exhibitions (sculpture, painting, writing) and a forum for the exchange of information and entertainment for the young. In addition, regular tea dances are organized, philosophy workshops and hearings of the Academy of Arts (music, dance, theater), conferences and meetings with artists.

== Notable people ==
- Sébastien Le Prestre de Vauban – military architect of Louis XIV, he directed the construction of the fortress of Huningue.
- Jean-Charles Abbatucci – General of the Army of the Rhine. He lost his life due to his injuries during an event during the first siege of the city in 1796.
- Joseph Barbanègre – French General, entrenched in Huningue during the third siege of the city in 1815.
- Armand Blanchard – French director, born in Huningue. He was mayor of Mulhouse from 1825 to 1830.
- Michel Ordener, Major General, born in Huningue on April 3, 1787. He was the son of General Michel Ordener.
- Johnny Stark: producer and imprésario (1922 in Huningue – 1989 in Paris)

== Gallery ==
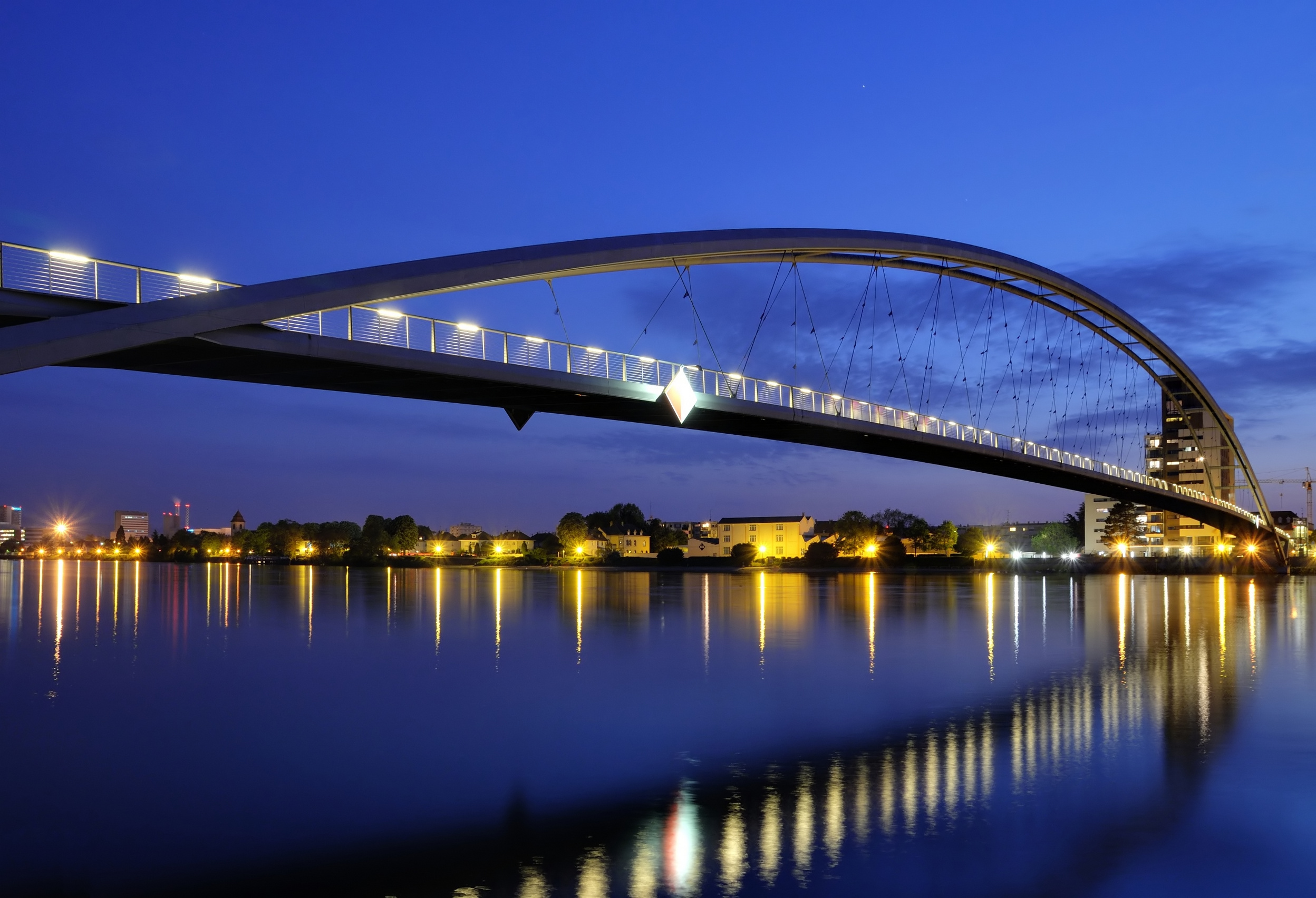
Three country bridge

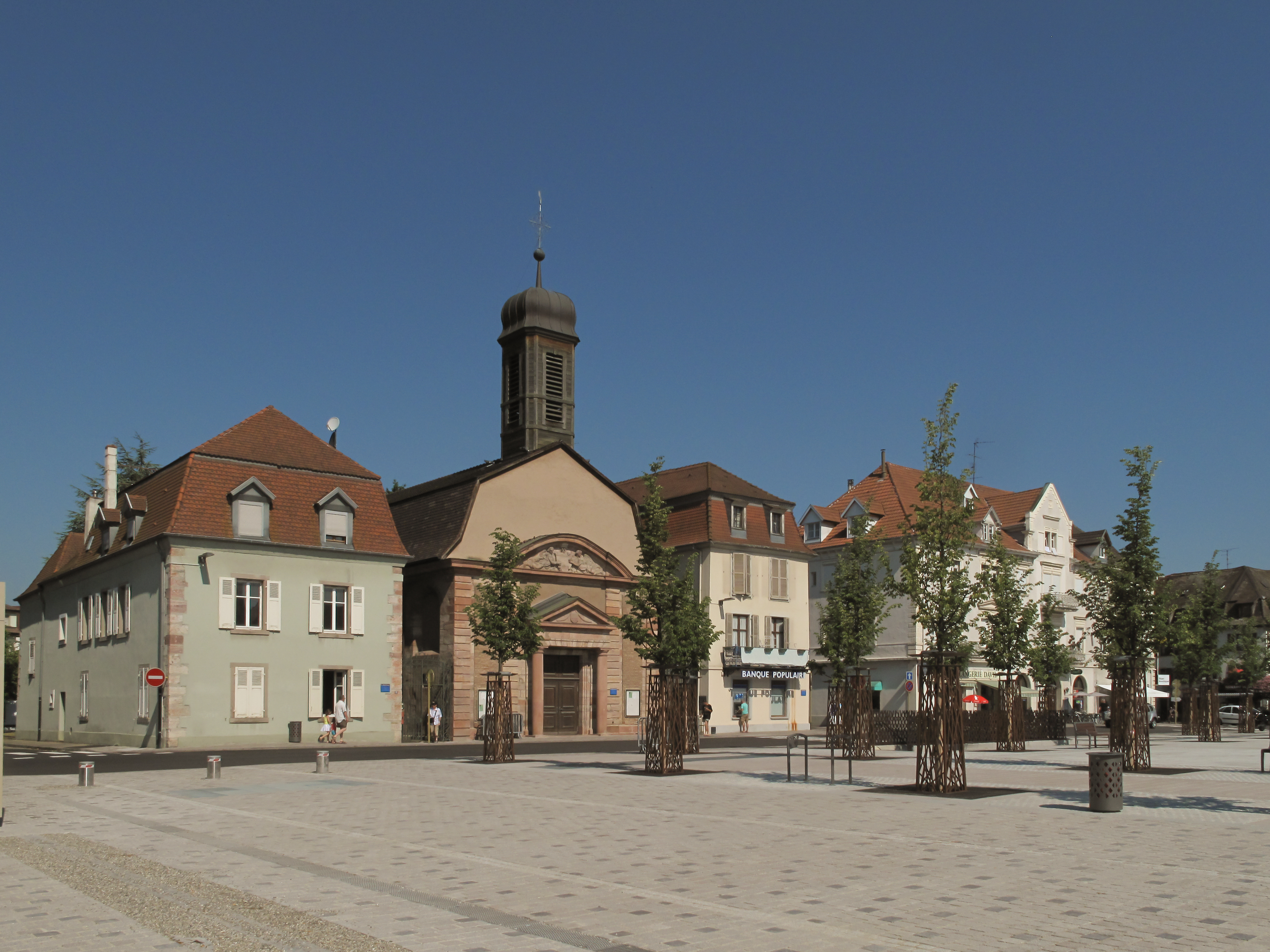
Place Abbatucci with church (ancienne église Saint-Louis)

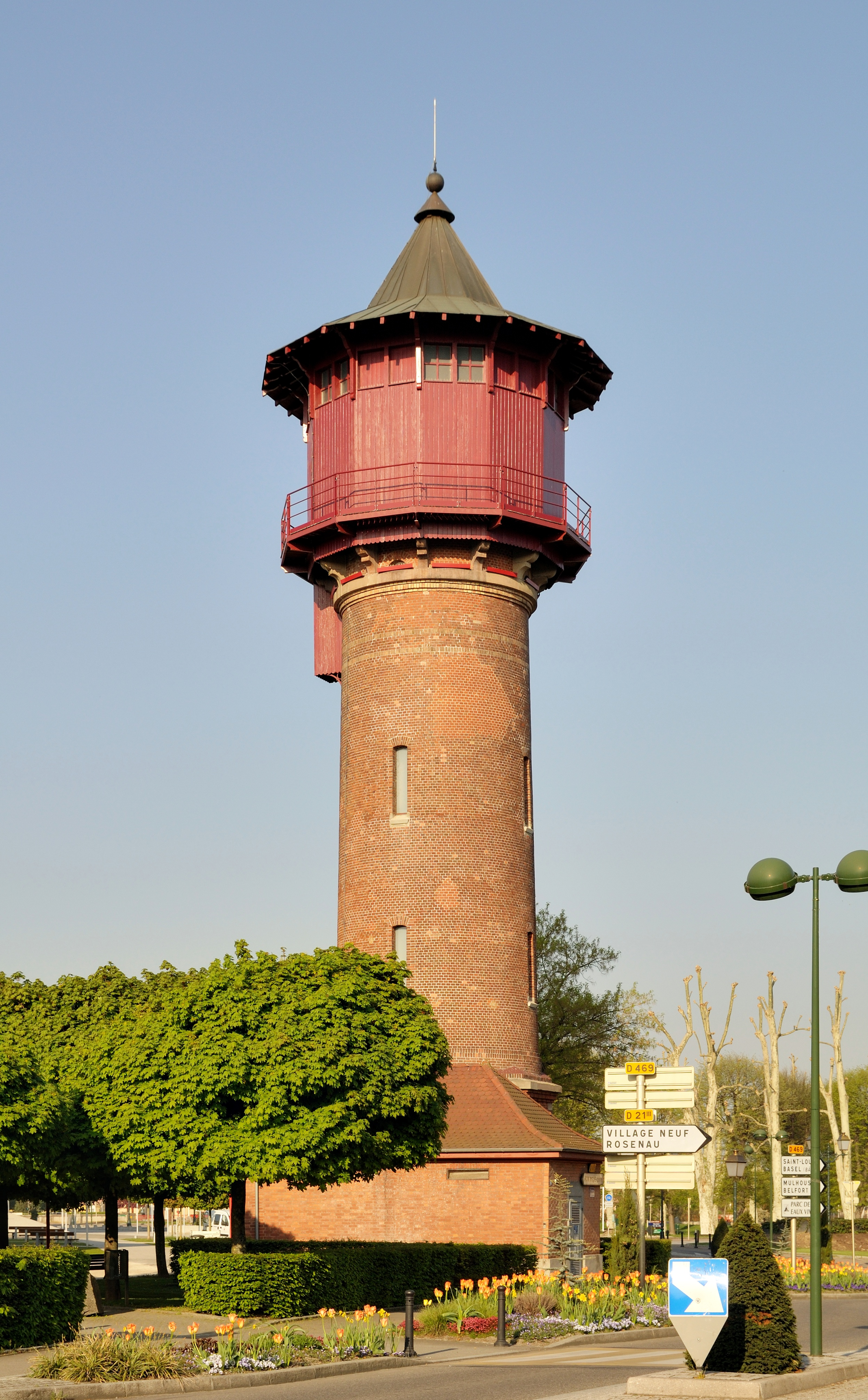
Château d'eau

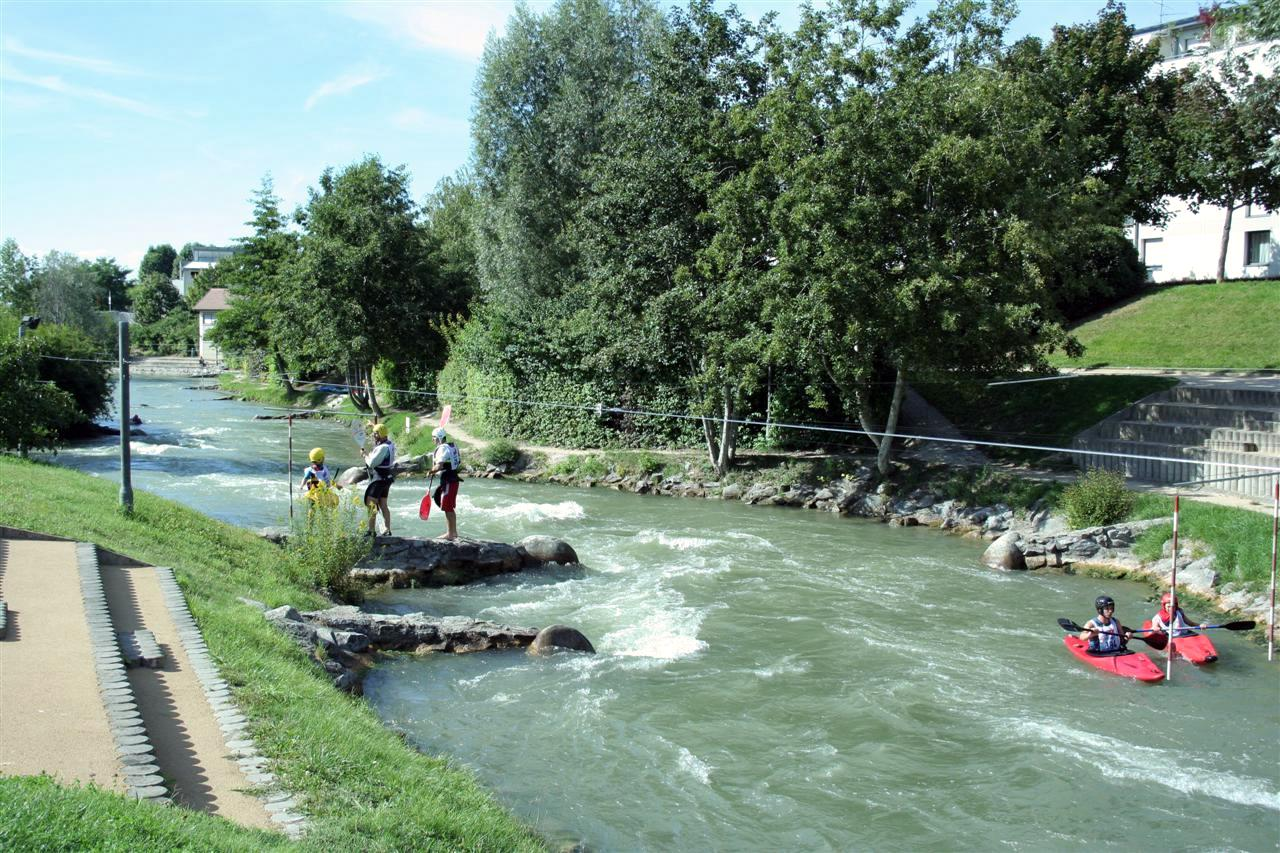
Le parc des Eaux Vives

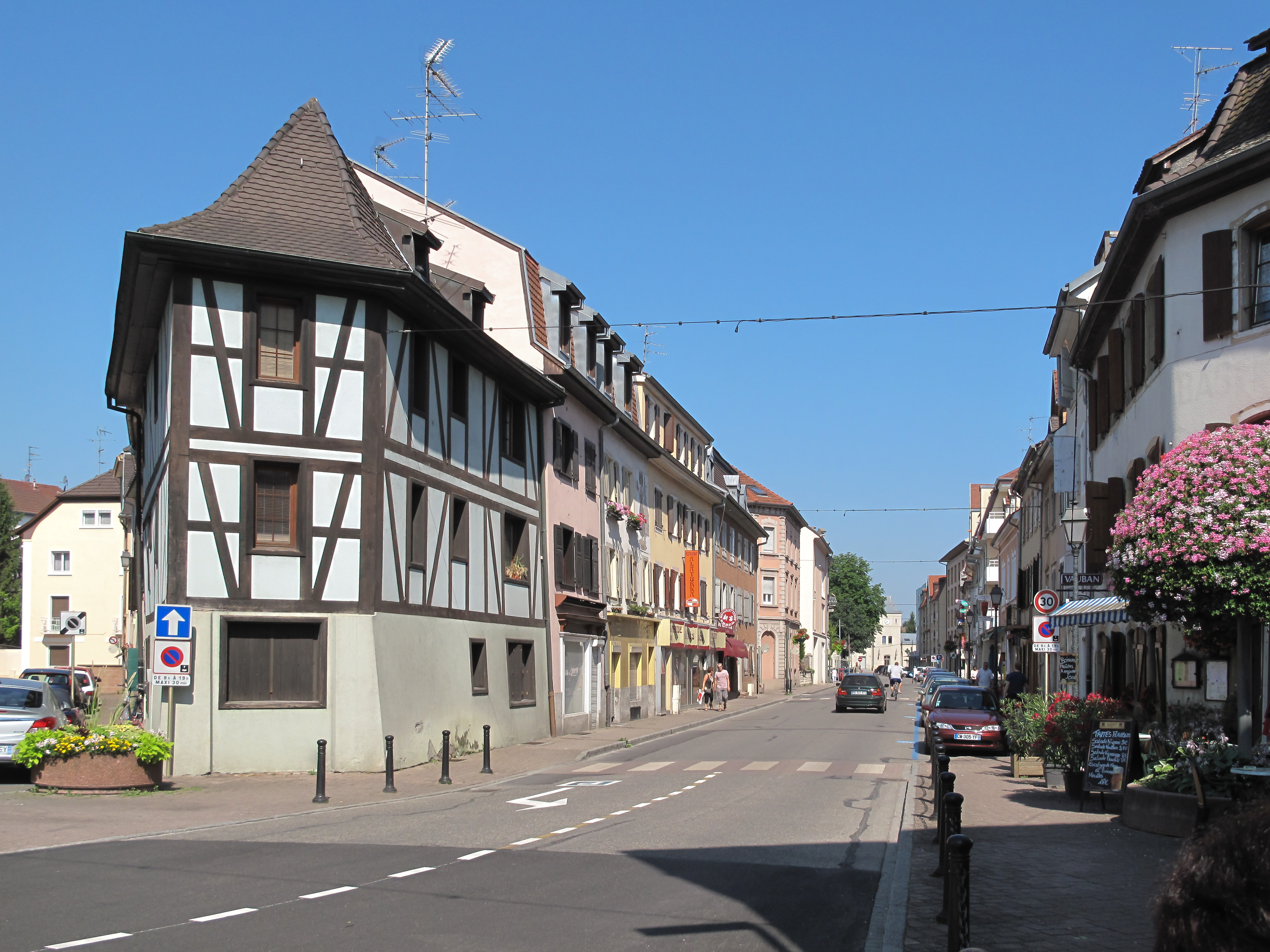
Huningue, view to a street
