= Huningue Canal =

Canal in eastern France

Canal de Huningue
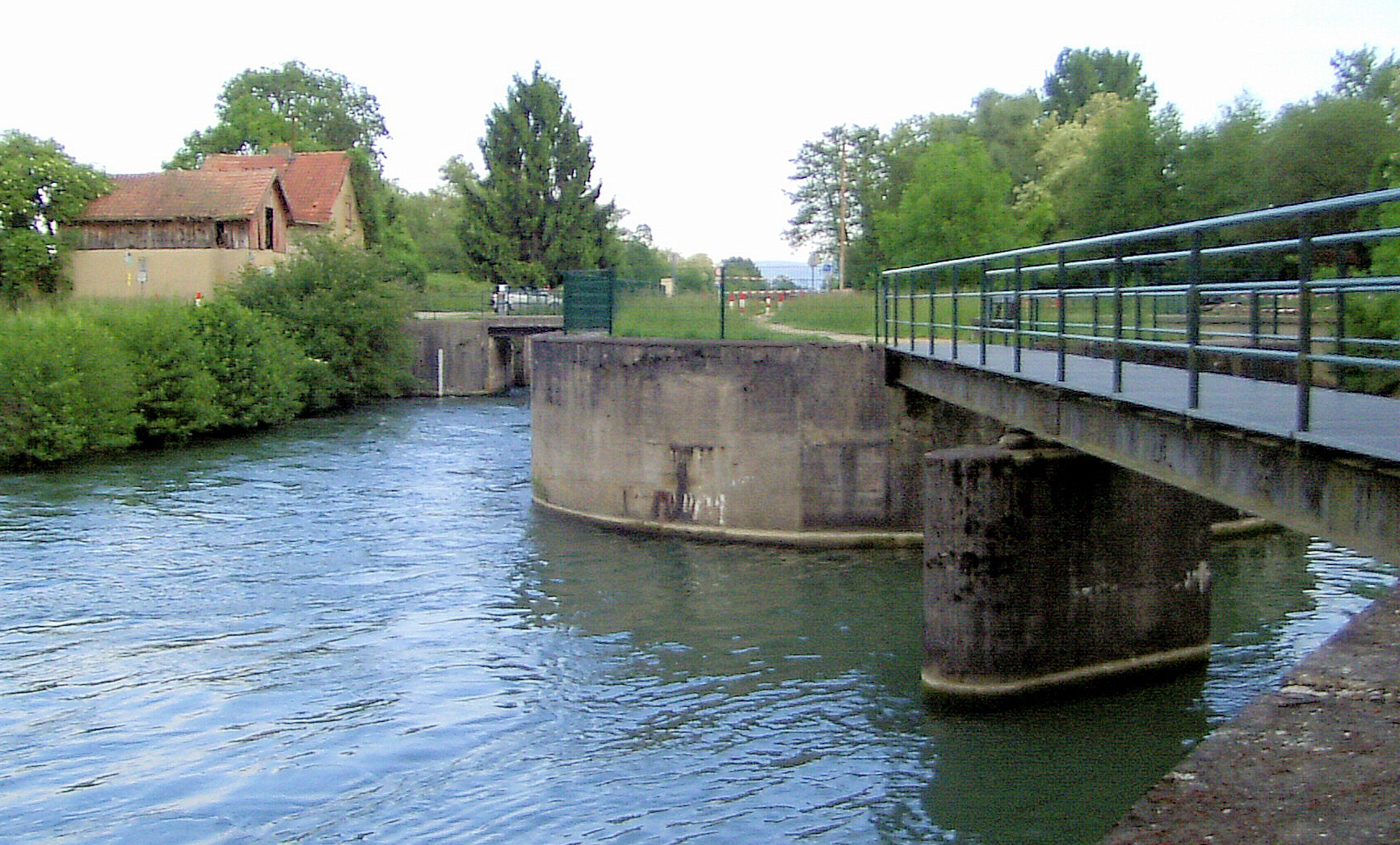
- Old lock on the Canal de Huningue
- Interactive map of Canal de Huningue

Specifications
- Status: In service Niffer to Kembs

History
- Construction began: 1806
- Date completed: 1828

Geography
- Start point: Rhine in Huningue
- End point: Niffer
- Beginning coordinates: 47.704444°N 7.5025°E
- Ending coordinates: 47.587778°N 7.585556°E
- Branch of: Canal du Rhône au Rhin

The Canal de Huningue (French pronunciation: [kanal də ynɛ̃ɡ]) is a canal in eastern France connecting the Rhine at Huningue to Niffer. The locks are no longer operational, but the canal is navigable from Niffer until Kembs.

The canal was enlarged in 1961 between Grand Canal d'Alsace and Mulhouse. At the same time, the canal between Mulhouse and Friesenheim was closed to traffic as it had been duplicated by the Grand Canal d'Alsace. Parts of the abandoned line are being restored.

== See also ==
- List of canals in France
