= Rhône–Rhine Canal =

Canal in France

Canal du Rhône au Rhin
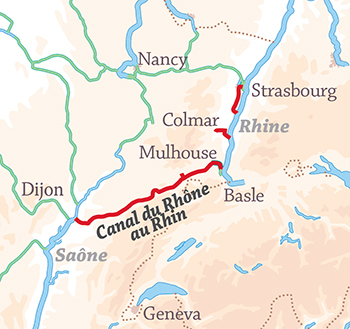
- Location of Canal du Rhône au Rhin and the two remaining sections of the former northern branch, France
- Interactive map of Canal du Rhône au Rhin

Specifications
- Length: 237 km
- Maximum boat length: 38.80 m (127.3 ft)
- Maximum boat beam: 5.10 m (16.7 ft)
- Locks: 112
- Maximum height above sea level: 340 m (1,120 ft)
- Minimum height above sea level: 179 m (587 ft)

History
- Date completed: 1833

Geography
- Start point: Saint-Symphorien-sur-Saône
- End point: Niffer
- Connects to: Rhine, Grand Canal d'Alsace, Embranchement de Belfort, Canal de Huningue, Saône

The Rhône–Rhine Canal (French: Canal du Rhône au Rhin, pronounced [kanal dy ʁon o ʁɛ̃]) is one of the important watershed canals of the French waterways, connecting the Rhine to the Saône and the Rhône and thereby the North Sea and the Mediterranean. As built, the canal was made up of four distinct sections:

- the branche Sud or southern branch, 224 km (139 mi) from the Saône just north of Saint-Jean-de-Losne to the Île Napoléon basin and junction just east of Mulhouse;
- the branche Nord or northern branch, 134 km (83 mi) from the Mulhouse junction to the Dusuzeau basin at the port of Strasbourg;
- the 22 km (14 mi) long Canal de Huningue, from the junction to the Rhine at Huningue, just north of the Swiss port of Basle;
- and the 10 km (6.2 mi) long Belfort branch, which when built was to be the first section of the Canal de Montbéliard à la Haute-Saône.

Developments for high-capacity navigation in the second half of the 20th century thoroughly transformed this Y-shaped system. When the first lock was built on the Grand Canal d'Alsace at Kembs, a new cut was also excavated from Kembs to Niffer, and the rest of the Canal de Huningue was upgraded from here to the docks at Mulhouse. A 3-km-long section of the former Canal de Huningue, from Niffer to Kembs, is maintained and gives access to a boat harbour, while the remainder of that canal to Basel has been closed, and the terminal basin transformed into a whitewater canoeing course.

Most of the northern branch was abandoned, and in the early 1980s the A36 motorway sliced through the canal embankment east of Mulhouse. Two sections were maintained and new cuts built from the Rhine to make them accessible:

- the Colmar Canal or embranchement de Colmar, 23 km (14 mi) long, from a new lock at Neuf-Brisach to Colmar;
- and a 34 km (21 mi) lateral canal starting from a new entrance lock at Rhinau and finishing in the basins of the port of Strasbourg.

A further major upheaval, planned from the 1960s, was construction of a high-capacity waterway to connect the Rhône-Saône corridor with the main European waterway network. This project was abandoned by Environment Minister Dominique Voynet in 1997.

The section from Mulhouse to Neuf-Brisach is abandoned, while the 29 km section between Artzenheim and Friesenheim has been partially restored by Alsace Region, but works were stopped in 2009 for financial reasons. A cycle path was built along this section in 2011, extending the popular cycle path south from Strasbourg.

== History ==
The first section of the Canal de Franche-Comté was authorised by Burgundy Council in 1783 and completed in 1802 from the Saône to Dôle. Napoleon was seeking to develop inland waterway connections throughout the country, and the Rhône-Rhine link was of such strategic importance that he gave his name to the project. The Emperor’s administration conceived the predecessor of today’s public-private partnership model, selling existing canals to private companies, to provide funds for new links. The proceeds were diverted for the war effort, and it was not until 1821 that this project, now renamed ‘Canal Monsieur’, was reactivated by the canal company set up for this purpose. Works were completed in 1833. Upgrading to Freycinet standards started in 1882, and the summit level was lowered, reducing the number of locks. The new high-capacity Rhine-Rhône waterway would have made the canal obsolete, but the environment minister Dominique Voynet cancelled that project in 1997. The Government then funded – as compensation – the backlog of maintenance works and other improvements, but with little impact on commercial traffic in 250-tonne péniches, which has all but disappeared.

== See also ==
- List of canals in France
