= Joseph Barbanègre =

French general and baron

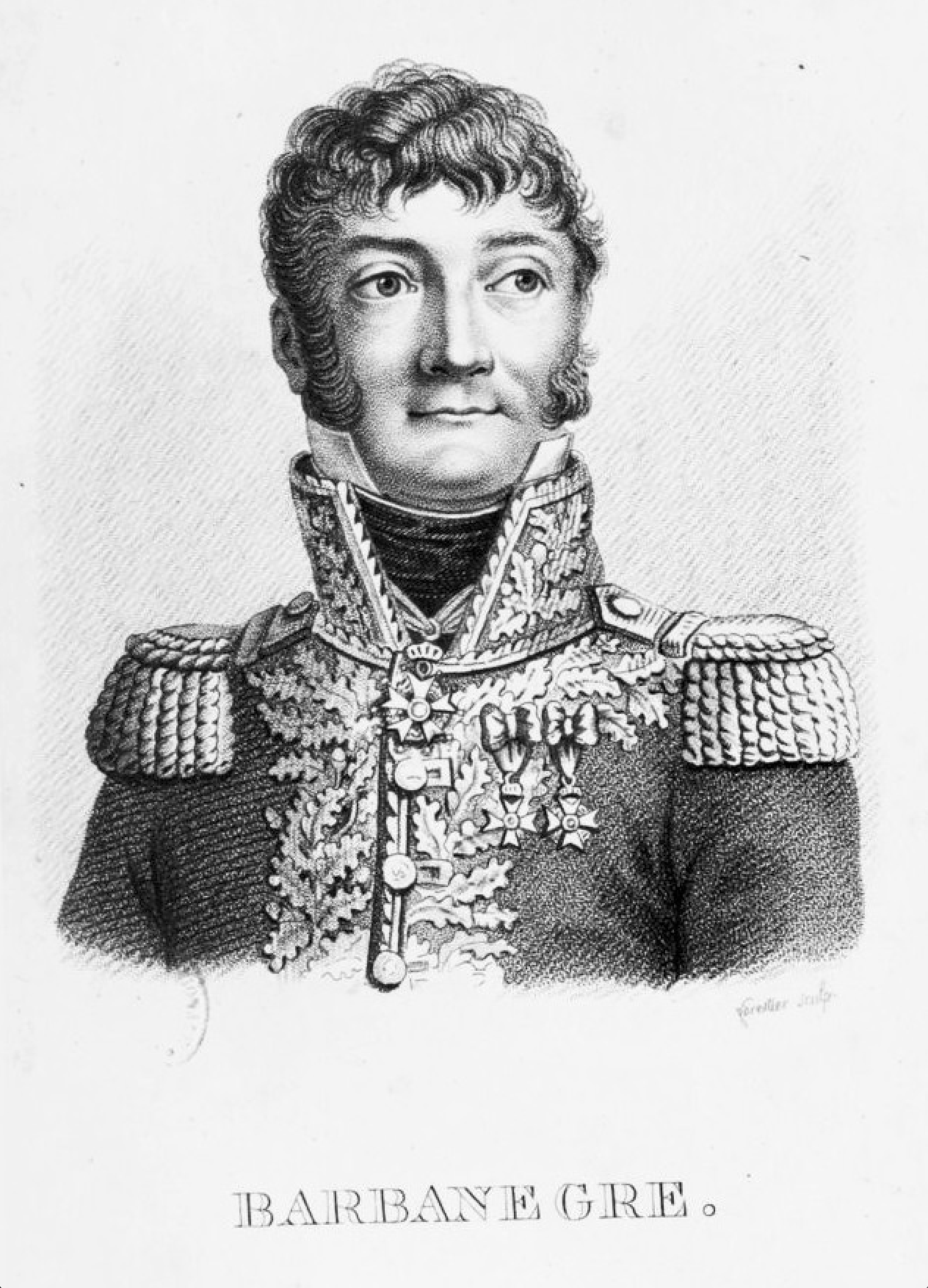
Joseph Barbanègre

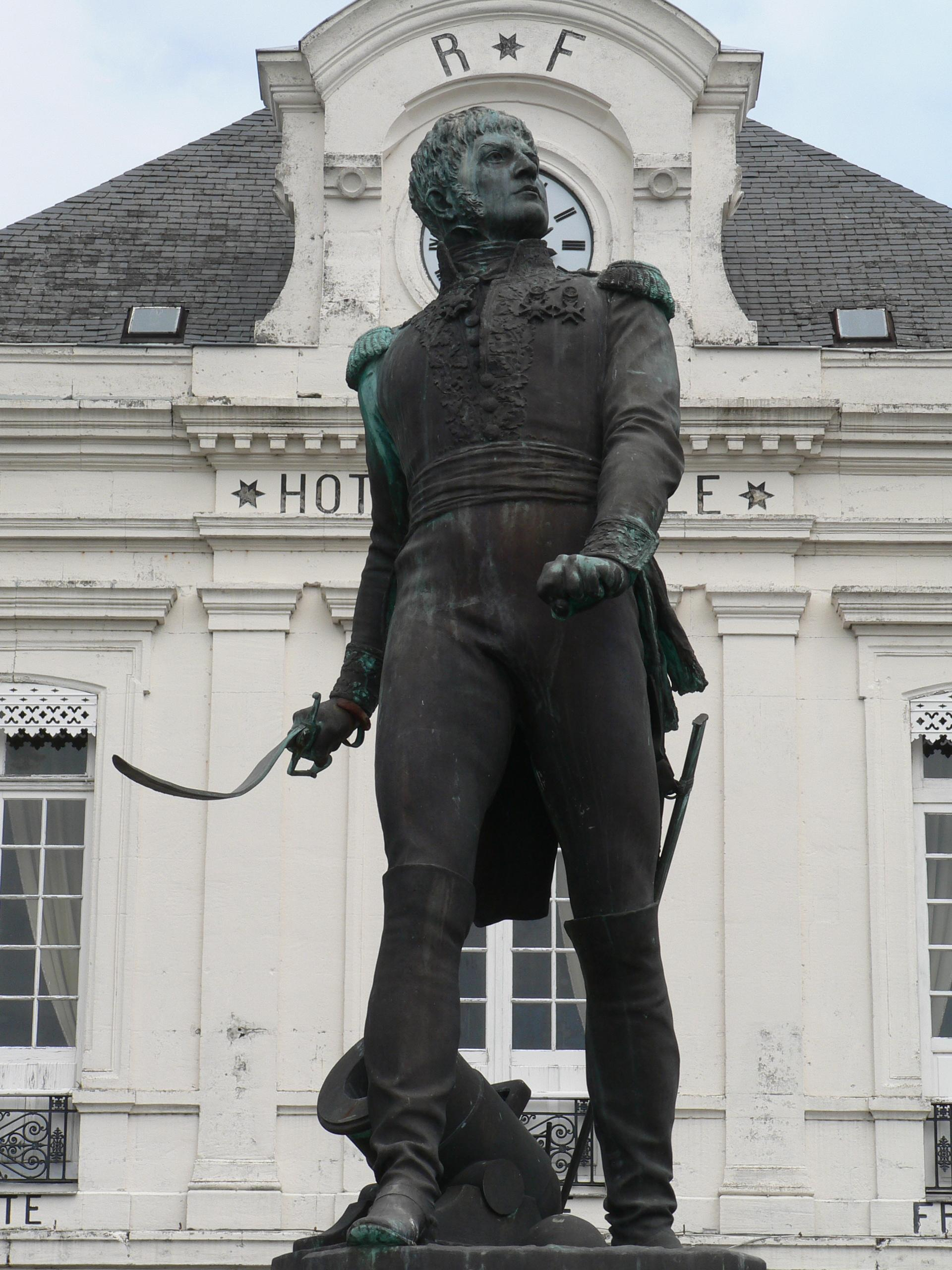
Joseph Barbanègre statue

Joseph Barbanègre (French pronunciation: [ʒozɛf baʁbanɛɡʁ]; 22 August 1772 – 7 November 1830) was a French General and a Baron of the First French Empire. He was governor of the Fortress of Huningue during the siege of the 1815 and held out until the end of hostilities, surrendering the place with full military honours on 26 August 1815.

== Biography ==
Barbanègre was born in Pontacq (Béarn). He was initially a sailor, then a captain in the 5th Battalion of the Lower Pyrenees, and Battalion Chief in the Consular Guard, He was then promoted to colonel of the 48th Infantry Regiment of the line on 29 August 1805, with whom he fought like a hero at Austerlitz, Iéna, and Eylau. He participated in all the Napoleonic campaigns, becoming Brigadier General after the Peace of Tilsit, 21 March 1809. He powerfully contributed to win battles at Eckmühl, Regensburg, and Wagram. He attained the rank of Commander of the Legion of Honor on 25 December 1805. On 20 August 1809 he became Baron of the Empire. In 1812 he joined the Grande Armée to Moscow; in Minsk, Borisov and Smolensk he had to organize supplies for the army. He joined Ney, who left the city on 17 November 1812. He was wounded in the Battle of Krasnoi, but succeeded to escape with Ney when crossing the Dnieper. He defended Stettin in 1813. But it was defending Fortress of Huningue against some 25,000 Austrians in 1815 which made him most famous, holding out with only several hundred men. On the 28 June shortly after word of Napoleon's abdication became known, and the French Provisional Government had requested a ceasefire, Barbanègre ordered the bombardment of Basel, something that contemporaries on the Seventh Coalition side considered to be a war crime.

He died in Paris, aged 58, and is buried in Père Lachaise Cemetery in the area reserved for marshals and generals of the Empire. In his home village of Pontacq there is a street bearing his name and a statue erected in his honor on the town hall square.

== Bibliography ==
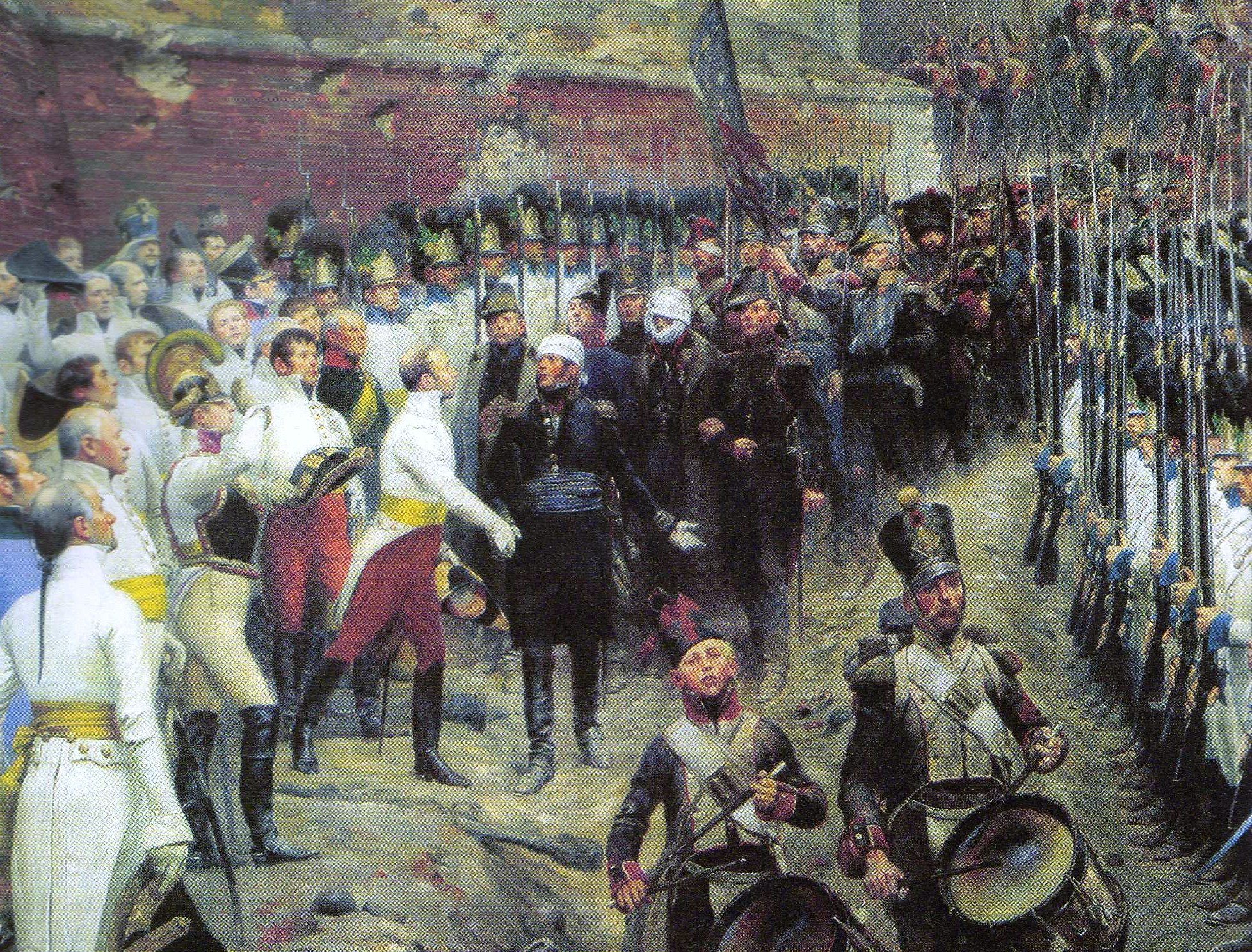
Sortie de la garnison de Huningue, 1815 by Édouard Detaille (depicting the moment the garrison leaves with full military honours at the end of the siege).

- Beaucourt, Gaston Louis Emmanuel Du Fresne, Marquis de; Allard, Paul; Guiraud, Jean (1925). Revue des questions historiques. V. Palmé. p. 35.
- Getty Images (31 August 2014). "General Joseph Barbanegre surrendering Hunigue to the Austrians 26 August 1815". gettyimages.
- Latruffe, Franck (1863). Huningue et Bâle devant les traités de 1815. Dupont. p. 344.
- MacQueen, James (1816). A narrative of the political and military events of 1815: intended to complete the narrative of the campaigns of 1812, 1813, and 1814. Printed for the author, by E. Khull & Co. and sold by John Smith & Son. p. 420.
