= Friedrich, Freiherr von Zoller =

Bavarian general (1762–1821)

Friedrich Johann Daniel Alois, Freiherr von Zoller (May 25, 1762 – February 25, 1821) was a Bavarian lieutenant-general who fought in the Napoleonic Wars.

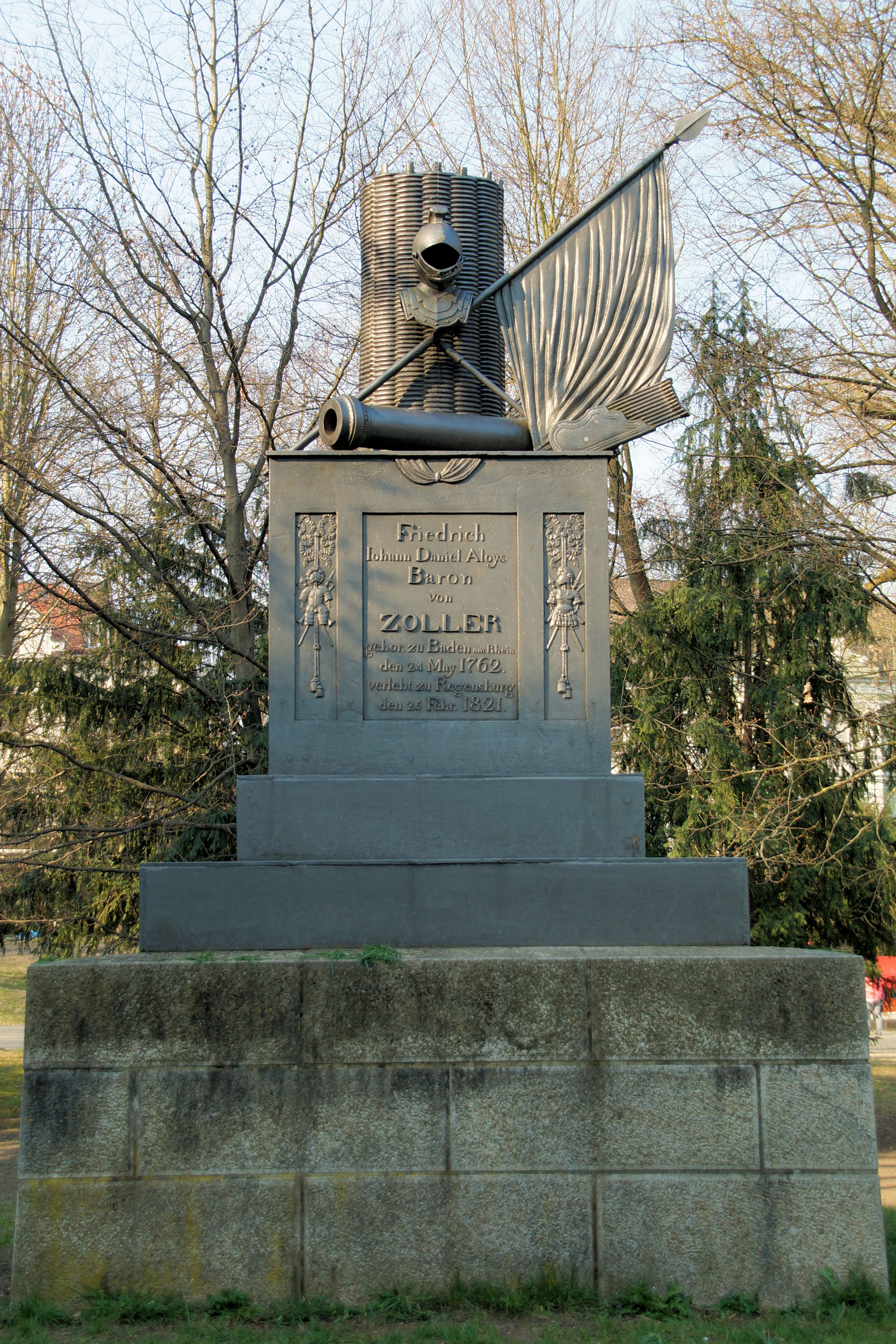
Memorial to Friedrich von Zoller at the Ostenallee in Regensburg, Germany

== Biography ==
Von Zoller was on born on 25 May 1762 in Baden-Baden, and because his father was a colonel in the French Army, in command of battalion in the Royal Deux-Ponts Regiment (ZweiBrucken/Two Bridges) commanded by Christian Graf von Forbach. On 8 April 1779 von Zoller was commissioned as a second lieutenant (sous-lieutenant) in the regiment, went with his regiment to North America where he participated in the Seven Years' War during which he was promoted to the First Lieutenant and Adjutant Major.

Shortly after the outbreak of the French Revolution von Zoller left France and in the years 1793 and 1794 served on the staff of the Prussian general Frederick of Hohenlohe-Ingelfingen in the War of the First Coalition against France. In 1799 he joined the armed forces of Elector Maximilian (the and later King of Bavaria). As a major in the Wrede battalion he fought against the French at the Battle of Möskirch on the night of 5/6 March 1800 he was badly wounded and lost an eye.

During the War of the Third Coalition (1805), von Zoller saw action on the Tyrolean border as lieutenant colonel in a corps of mountain militia troops (Gebirgsschützen), and for this service was awarded the Legion of Honour and the Military Order of Max Joseph. In the campaign of 1806/7, he commanded a light infantry regiment against Prussia. In 1809 in the war against Austria and in 1812 during the Russian Campaign he was a colonel of a regiment. During the Russian Campaign he was promoted to major general and brigadier.

After the disastrous retreat from Russia, von Zoller was posted to Płock on the Vistula (were the remnants of the Bavarian regiments which had taken part in the Russian Campaign were refitted and remanded) to take command of the 2nd Infantry Brigade. On 20 January 1814 marched the brigade to Toruń and took over the occupation of the city. After an honourable defence against the besieging Russians he surrendered the city on 18 April and returned to Bavaria.

When Bavaria changed sides and joined the Coalition against France, von Zoller was with the Bavarian forces that fought against the French at the battle of Hanau (October 1813). In the same month was promoted to lieutenant-general, given command of a division. He was ordered do take command at the siege of the fortress of Huningue. The siege lasted until the end of the war which ended with the recognition of Louis XVIII as the French monarch in 1814. The next year, during Napoleon's Hundred Days he again led an infantry division but it saw little action. In recognition of his service to Bavaria he was ennobled as baron von Zoller on 30 January 1816. He died on 25 February 1821 in Regensburg.

== Sources ==
- Hueck, Walter von; et al. (2005), Genealogisches Handbuch des Adels, Adelslexikon, vol. XVI, Limburg: C. A. Starke Verlag, p. 566, ISBN 3-7980-0837-X

Attribution
