= Société maritime suisse =

Swiss maritime trading company (1789–1806)

- Company type: Limited partnership (en commandite)
- Industry: Maritime trade
- Founded: 1789
- Defunct: 1806
- Headquarters: Brussels
- Key people: Jacques Rabaud & Cie; Senn, Bidermann & Cie

The Société maritime suisse was a limited partnership established in 1789 as a joint Swiss-French commercial venture for maritime trade. Originally founded in Brussels under the name Société pour le commerce des Indes orientales (Society for Trade with the East Indies), the company financed and organized voyages to India during the late 18th century.

== History ==
The Société maritime suisse was established as a limited partnership in 1789 in Brussels. Initially named the Société pour le commerce des Indes orientales, it was chartered for a period of seven years with the purpose of financing and organizing commercial voyages to India.

The company was directed by its main shareholders, which included Jacques Rabaud & Cie, a shipping company based in Marseille, and Senn, Bidermann & Cie, a textile firm headquartered in Paris. The venture represented a Franco-Swiss collaboration with significant capital contributions from Swiss merchants and financiers.

The initial capital of 6 million livres tournois was supplemented by a loan of 2 million livres. These funds were provided primarily by Swiss textile merchants and financiers from Geneva, Basel, and Winterthur. The Société was part of a larger Franco-Swiss group controlled by Jacques Biedermann of Winterthur, who was particularly active in the trading and manufacturing of indiennes (printed cotton fabrics).

== Operations and decline ==
The company initially proved highly profitable through its maritime commerce operations. However, this success was interrupted by the outbreak of the French Revolutionary Wars, particularly the maritime conflict between France and Britain. With the intensification of Anglo-French naval hostilities, trade with India collapsed entirely in 1793.

Following the disruption of its core business activities, the company entered liquidation beginning in 1796. The liquidation process proved lengthy, extending over a period of ten years until 1806. Although creditors were fully repaid through the liquidation proceedings, the shareholders suffered substantial losses, with investors ultimately recovering only 22% of their original investment (a loss of 78%).

== Bibliography ==
- Weisz, L., Studien zur Handels- und Industrie-Geschichte der Schweiz, 1, 1938, pp. 47–74
- Rambert, G., Histoire du commerce de Marseille, 6, 1960
- Peyer, H.C., Von Handel und Bank im alten Zürich, 1968, pp. 182–189
- Veyrassat, B., Négociants et fabricants dans l'industrie cotonnière suisse, 1760–1840, 1982
