= Paul Philippe Polier =

Swiss military officer (1711–1759)

- Born: 24 April 1711; Lausanne, Switzerland
- Died: August 1759 (aged 48); Madras, India
- Occupation: Military officer

Paul Philippe Polier (24 April 1711 – August 1759) was a Swiss mercenary who served successively the Kingdom of Sardinia, the Margraviate of Baden-Durlach, and the British East India Company.

== Life and career ==
Polier was born in Lausanne, Vaud, the son Jean Jacques Polier , banneret of Lausanne, and Salomé Jeanne Elisabeth Quisard. He was the brother of Jean-Antoine-Noé Polier, cousin of Antoine Polier and nephew of Georges Polier. Polier was a member of the Council of Two Hundred of Lausanne from 1735 to 1756. He never married.

Polier became a lieutenant in Sardinian service in the Roguin Regiment in 1733 and captain-lieutenant in 1742. From 1743 he commanded his own company in the Baden-Durlach Regiment. On returning home in 1748, Polier was appointed major of the militia, and in 1751 he entered the service of the British East India Company. As commander of Fort St. David, he was taken prisoner by the French during the 1758–1759 Siege of Madras. Schaub died at Fort St. George in Madras in August 1759, aged 48.

== Bibliography ==
- E. Piguet, "Paul-Philippe Polier et la reddition du Fort St-David aux Indes", in Revue historique vaudoise, 1933, 174–186.
