= Affaire du Tamponnement =

1734–1738 Geneva political crisis

The affaire du Tamponnement ("plugging affair") was a political crisis in the Republic of Geneva between 1734 and 1738, and one of the key moments of the second episode of the Geneva revolutions of the 18th century.

== Background ==
In 1714–1715, Geneva's restricted councils — the Two Hundred and the Petit Conseil — decided to build a new city wall and to finance it through a series of indirect taxes, without consulting the General Council. This decision triggered, with some delay, the second episode of the Geneva revolutions of the 18th century (after the Fatio affair in 1707). On 4 March 1734, in a solemn demonstration, the majority of citizens and burghers demanded the restoration of the General Council's fiscal powers.

== The plugging incident ==
The government, aware that a refusal would provoke a violent reaction and threaten a political system based on the concentration of power in an oligarchy, tasked several magistrates, including Jean Trembley, with taking countermeasures. One of these was to disable part of the city's artillery by inserting wooden cylinders (tampons) into the touch holes of the cannon. The sabotage was discovered and denounced on 2 July, and gave the crisis its name. Although the standoff that followed kept the appearance of legality, the city remained under arms and under the constant threat of a coup d'état led by Bernard de Budé.

== Resolution ==
After a day of civil war on 21–22 August 1737 left the government party powerless, it called on the allied cantons of Bern and Zürich, together with neighboring France, to mediate. The crisis ended on 8 May 1738, when the General Council adopted the Règlement [...] pour la pacification des troubles [...] drawn up by the mediating powers.

== Bibliography ==
- Histoire de Genève des origines à 1798, 1951, pp. 414–442.
- Sautier, J.: La Médiation de 1737–1738, 2 vols., 1979.
- Gür, A.: "Les lettres 'séditieuses' anonymes de 1718, étude et textes", in: Bulletin de la Société d'histoire et d'archéologie de Genève, 17, 1981, pp. 129–205.
- Silvestrini, G.: Alle radici del pensiero di Rousseau, 1993.
- Les monuments d'art et d'histoire du canton de Genève, 3, 2010, pp. 231–249.
