= Niffer =

Commune in Grand Est, France

- Commune
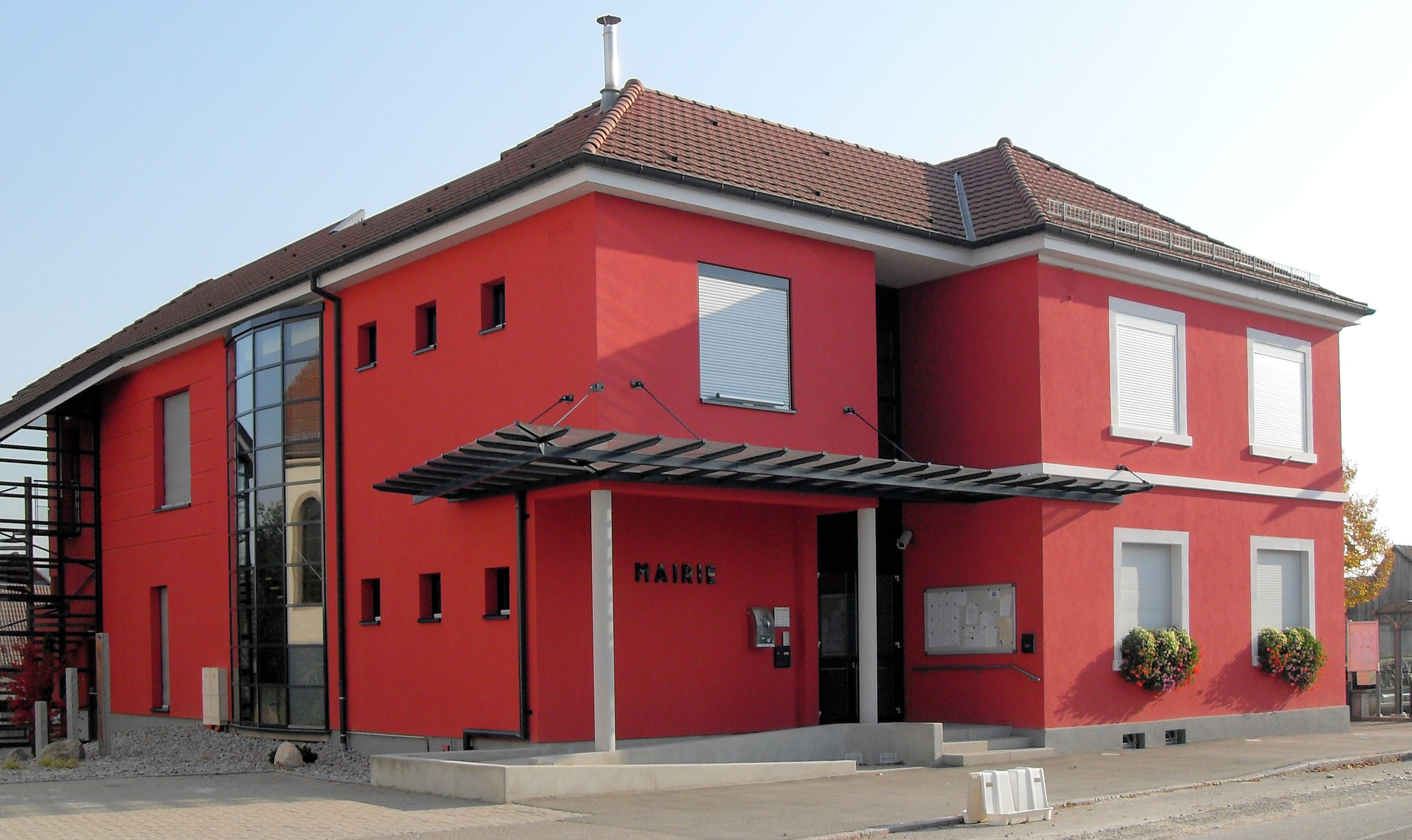
- The town hall in Niffer

- Coat of arms
- Location of Niffer
- Location within France Location within Grand Est
- Coordinates: 47°42′53″N 7°30′37″E
- Country: France
- Region: Grand Est
- Department: Haut-Rhin
- Arrondissement: Mulhouse
- Canton: Rixheim
- Intercommunality: CA Mulhouse Alsace Agglomération

Government
  - Mayor (2020–2026): Véronique Meyer
- Area^{1}: 8.72 km^{2} (3.37 sq mi)
- Elevation: 232 m (761 ft)
- Highest elevation: 245 m (804 ft)
- Lowest elevation: 222 m (728 ft)
- Population (2023): 985
  - Density: 113/km^{2} (293/sq mi)
- Time zone: UTC+01:00 (CET)
  - Summer (DST): UTC+02:00 (CEST)
- INSEE/Postal code: 68238 /68680
- ^{1} French Land Register data, which excludes lakes, ponds, glaciers > 1 km^{2} (0.386 sq mi or 247 acres) and river estuaries.

Niffer (French pronunciation: [nifɛʁ]) is a commune in the Haut-Rhin department in Alsace in north-eastern France.

== See also ==
- Communes of the Haut-Rhin department
