= Salmon War =

Political conflict on the Rhine, 1736–1737

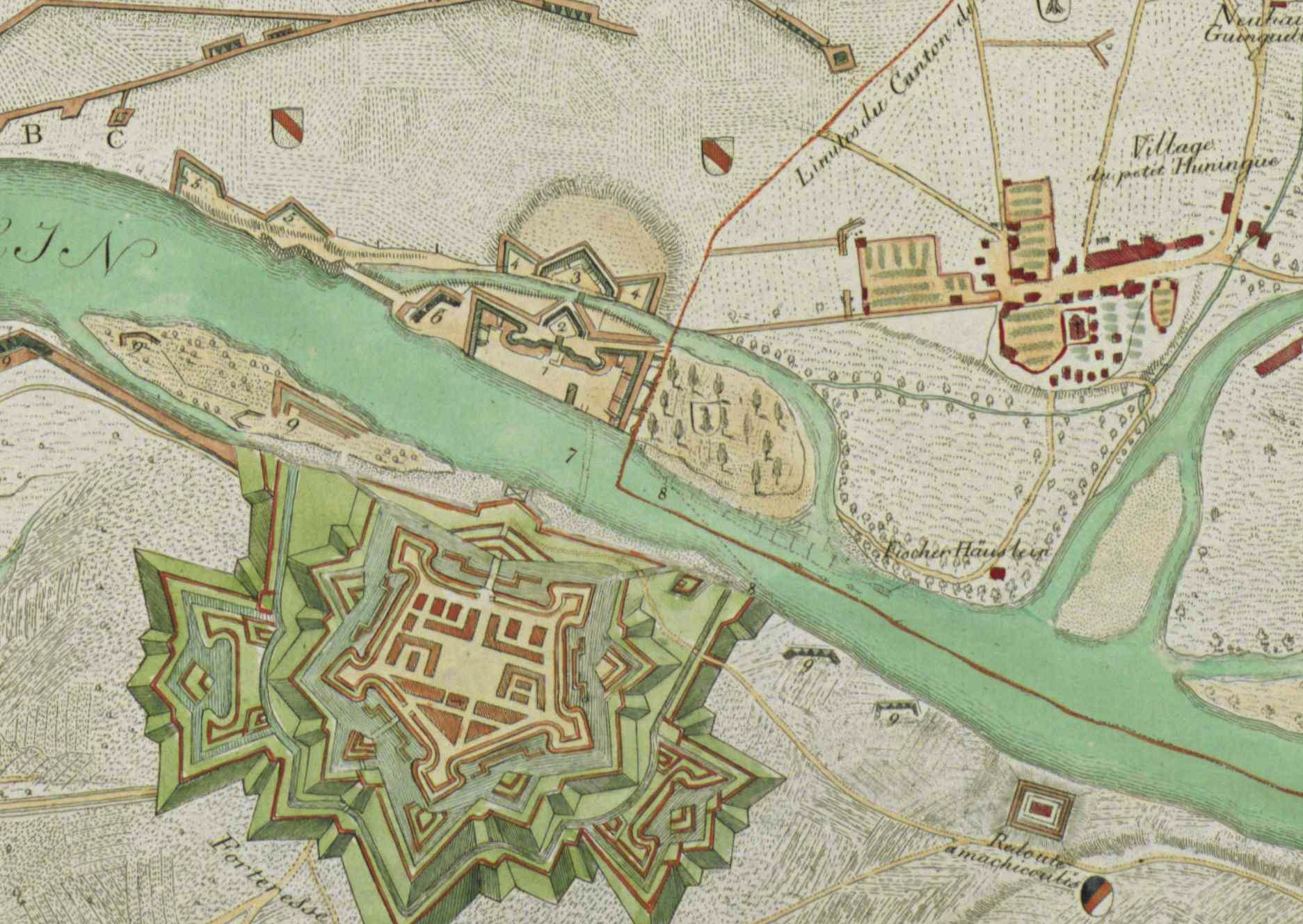
The conflict zone, around 1796/97, east at the top. An arm of the Rhine separates the island of Schusterinsel in the centre from the mainland. Below it, on the left bank of the Rhine, lies the fortress of Hüningen. On the island and the right bank of the Rhine are its outworks. The forked mouth of the Wiese river and Kleinhüningen are right and above right. The 1738 border with Basel is shown as a red line and divides the Schusterinsel and river. (the width of the map is just under 2 kilometres, its height is just under 1.4 kilometres.)

The Salmon War (German: Lachsfangstreit) of 1736/37 was a political conflict between the confederate Canton of Basel and the Kingdom of France over fishing rights and the location of their state border in the River Rhine.

== Conflicts ==
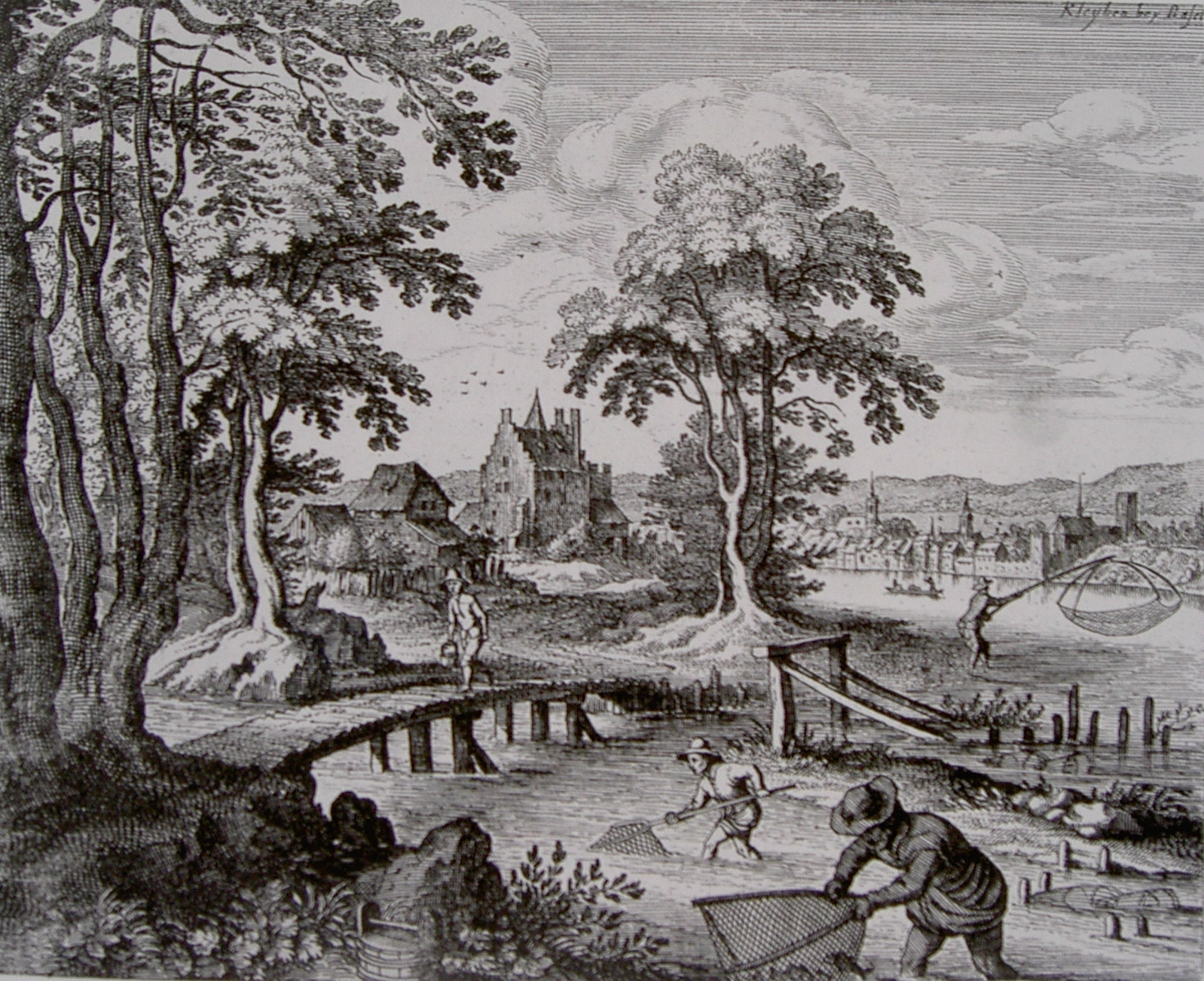
Fisherman at the mouth of the Wiese (engraved by Matthäus Merian the Elder, 17th century)

In 1735 and 1736, at the start of the salmon season, there were again insults thrown and mass struggles between the fishermen of Neudorf, Hüningen and Kleinhüningen. On the Hüningen side about two dozen men were involved, on the Kleinhüningen side the figures vary between forty and two hundred. Basel fishermen also interfered on the grounds that the old regulations were no longer valid.

The conflict became a state-level issue through the news that the Obervogt of Kleinhüningen, Jakob Christoph Frey, an official of the Basel Estate, had been involved in the violence of 1736 and organized it out of his own interest. As part of his income, he received a third of the captured fish. In addition, the village guard had beaten his drum, giving the riot the character of a military engagement.

The accusations were denied by Basel, but French officials insisted their information was correct and exerted huge pressure on Basel by the end of the year. From 16 November onwards, they cut off Basel's trading links (in particular food supplies and income) with Alsace, banned Basel's citizens from travelling and arrested three of them in Strasbourg. They also demanded the prosecution of the Kleinhüningen parties and the Obervogt. Last but not least, they officially questioned the existing border markers.

A request for support from Basel to the Swiss states failed due to confessional and political antagonism and the influence of the French Ambassador in Solothurn. The extraordinary meeting demanded by Basel on early January 1737 did not make any decisions. Instead, it was suggested that Basel should back down. The French officials sharply rejected Basel's delegations in Strasbourg and Solothurn and its letters of justification to Paris. A number of arrests in Kleinhüningen and contacts with the Dutch ambassador in Paris did not contribute to a relaxation of tension. There were even rumours that France was planning a military intervention.

== Literature ==
- Carl Wieland: Der Kleinhüninger Lachsfangstreit 1736. In: Basler Jahrbuch. 1889, pp. 37–85.
- Peter Ochs: Geschichte der Stadt und Landschaft Basel. Vol. 7. Schweighauser, Basel, 1821, Vol. 7, p. 567–579.
- Markus Lutz: Baslerisches Bürger-Buch. Schweighauser, Basel, 1819, p. 124.
- Markus Lutz: Chronik von Basel oder die Hauptmomente der Baslerischen Geschichte. Samuel Flick, Basel, 1809, pp. 292–294.
